= History of the Opera web browser =

MultiTorg Opera

The history of the Opera web browser began in 1994 when it was started as a research project at Telenor, the largest Norwegian telecommunications company. In 1995, the project branched out into a separate company named Opera Software ASA, with the first publicly available version released in 1996. Opera has undergone extensive changes and improvements, and introduced notable features such as Speed Dial and the Sidebar.

Until version 2.0, the Opera browser was called MultiTorg Opera (version 1.0) and had only a limited internal release—although it was demonstrated publicly at the Third International WWW Conference in April 1995. It was known for its multiple document interface (MDI) and 'hotlist' (sidebar), which made browsing several pages at once much easier, as well as being the first browser to completely focus on adhering to the W3C standards.

In February 2013, Opera Software announced that their in-house rendering engine, Presto, would be phased out in favour of WebKit. Opera 15 saw the browser being fully rewritten, with this and subsequent releases being based on Blink and Chromium.

== Original versions ==
=== Version 2 ===
Version 2.0, the first public release of Opera, was released as shareware in 1996.

Due to popular demand, Opera Software showed interest in programming its browser for alternative operating systems such as Apple Macintosh, QNX and BeOS. On October 10, 1997, they launched "Project Magic", an effort to measure user interest in the development of new Opera releases for other operating systems, in order to fund the development of a new version appropriately. On November 30, 1997 they closed voting for which operating system to develop with. Project Magic then became a news column for updates for alternative operating systems until version 4.

=== Version 3 ===
Opera 3.62 Browsing Opera on Windows 9x

Opera 3 was the first version of Opera with JavaScript support, but Java was still missing. It was released for multiple operating systems on December 31, 1997.

== Elektra versions ==
=== Version 3.5/3.6 ===
In 1998, Opera 3.5 was released, adding Cascading Style Sheets (CSS) support, TLS 1.0 the Elektra rendering engine, and file upload capability.

Since version 3.5, Opera has supported CSS, and Håkon Wium Lie, one of the inventors of CSS, is the CTO at Opera. Up to 6.0 Opera supported most common web standards, Netscape plugins and some other recent standards such as WAP and WML for wireless devices, but its implementation of advanced ECMAScript (of which "JavaScript" is an implementation) and the HTML Document Object Model was poor.

Opera 3.62 adds EPOC support.

=== Version 4 ===
On June 28, 2000, Opera 4 was released, introducing a new cross-platform core, tabbed browsing making it so that the search bar only represented the selected tab, and a new integrated email client.

=== Version 5 ===
Opera 5.02 on Windows XP

Opera 5, released on December 6, 2000, was the first version which was ad-sponsored instead of having a trial period. Version 5 also supported ICQ, but this was dropped from later versions.

Opera supported OS/2 for the first time, requiring WarpIN and Odin to be installed.

Opera 5.10 (April 2001) was the first version to recognize mouse gestures, but this feature was disabled by default.

=== Version 6 ===
Opera 6.0

On November 29, 2001, Opera 6 was released with new features including Unicode support, and offering a single document interface as well as the multiple document interface allowed by previous versions.

Opera 6.1 was the first release for FreeBSD.

==== First MSN.com controversy ====
On October 24, 2001, Microsoft blocked users of browsers other than Internet Explorer, including Opera, from accessing MSN.com. After accusations of monopolistic behavior, Microsoft lifted the restrictions two days later. However, as late as November 2001, Opera users were still locked out from some MSN.com content, despite Opera's ability to display the content had it been served.

== Presto versions ==
=== Version 7 ===
Opera 7.02

On January 28, 2003, Opera 7 was released, introducing the new "Presto" layout engine, with improved CSS, client-side scripting, and Document Object Model (DOM) support.

Version 7.0 saw Opera undergo an extensive rewrite with the faster and more powerful Presto layout engine. The new engine brought almost full support for the HTML DOM meaning that parts of, or a whole, page can be re-rendered in response to DOM and script events.

Development for all supported platforms was unified with Opera 7.11 for Linux, Opera 7.21 for Solaris and FreeBSD, and Opera 7.50 for macOS (formerly Mac OS X). Support for the Classic Mac OS was dropped.

A 2004 review in The Washington Post described Opera 7.5 as being excessively complex and difficult to use. The review also criticized the free edition's use of obtrusive advertisements when other browsers such as Mozilla and Safari were offered free of charge without including advertisements.

In August 2004, Opera 7.6 began limited alpha testing. It had more advanced standards support, and introduced voice support for Opera, as well as support for Voice XML. Opera also announced a new browser for Interactive Television, which included a fit to width option Opera 8 introduced. Fit to Width is a technology that initially utilized the power of CSS, but it is now internal Opera technology. Pages are dynamically resized by making images and/or text smaller, and even removing images with specific dimensions to make it fit on any screen width, improving the experience on smaller screens dramatically. Opera 7.6 was never officially released as a final version. It was last version that would run under Mac OS X Cheetah and Mac OS X Puma, with later versions requiring Mac OS X Jaguar or later.

On January 12, 2005, Opera Software announced that it would offer free licenses to higher education institutions, a change from the previous cost of $1,000 USD for unlimited licenses. Schools that opted for the free license included Massachusetts Institute of Technology (MIT), Harvard University, University of Oxford, Georgia Institute of Technology, and Duke University. Opera was commonly criticized for having been ad-sponsored, since this was seen as a barrier to gaining market share. In the newer versions the user was allowed a choice of generic graphical banners, or text-based targeted advertisements provided by Google based upon the page being viewed. Users could pay a license fee to remove the advertisement bar.

==== Second MSN.com controversy ====
In 2003, MSN.com was configured to present Opera browsers with a style sheet used for old versions of Microsoft Internet Explorer. Other browsers received either a style sheet tailored to them, or at least the latest Internet Explorer style sheet. The outdated style sheet that Opera received caused Opera to move a significant amount of MSN.com's content 30 pixels to the left of where it should be, distorting the page and making it appear as though there was a bug in Opera.

In response, the Opera Software company created a special "Bork" edition of Opera which displayed gibberish instead of MSN.com but not on any other web site. They said they did this to make a point about the necessity of a harmonious relationship between web browsers and web sites.

After the complaints, Microsoft changed their servers to present the latest version of Opera, version 7, with the style sheet served to the latest version of Internet Explorer, which resolved the problem. However, Microsoft continued to serve the outdated style sheet to the older Opera 6.

==== Hotmail controversy ====
In November 2004, Opera Software sent an electronic message to Microsoft, complaining that Opera users were sent an incomplete JavaScript file when using Hotmail (now Outlook.com). The incomplete file prevented Opera users from emptying their "Junk E-mail" folders. The Opera Software company later sent a physical letter to Microsoft. Nevertheless, as of February 11, 2005, Microsoft had neither replied to the messages nor corrected the issue.

=== Version 8 ===
Opera 8.0 on Windows XP

On April 19, 2005, version 8.0 was released. Besides supporting SVG Tiny, multimodal features and User JavaScript, the default user interface was cleaned up and simplified. The default home page was an improved search portal. The changes displeased a number of existing users since some advanced settings became hidden.

Version 8.0 introduced support for Scalable Vector Graphics (SVG) 1.1 Tiny. This marked the first major web browser to natively support some form of SVG.

Version 8.5 was released on September 20, 2005. Opera announced that their browser would be available free of charge and without advertisements, although the company still continued to sell support contracts. Enhancements included automatic client-side fixing of web sites that did not render correctly, and a number of security fixes.

=== Version 9 ===
Opera 9 Browsing Wikipedia Powered on MediaWiki on Linux in GNOME 2 Desktop

Version 9.0 was the first Microsoft Windows, Linux, and BSD browser to pass the Acid2 test. This version, released on June 20, 2006, added XSLT and improved SVG to 1.1 Basic level.

This was the first version to be on the Wii.

Beta versions of Opera 9 included an Easter egg that, when triggered, affects the Acid2 test. After the page has been open for a while, the eyes of the smiley will follow the cursor around and when the user clicks on the eyes, a JavaScript alert will read "Because just passing is not enough ;)". The changes to the Acid2 code were applied using Opera's browser.js feature, and remain available in a separate User JavaScript file.

Opera introduced Widgets, small web applications, a built-in BitTorrent client, improved content blocking and a built-in tool for creating and editing search engines. Opera also added ability to read MHTML and to save the web page as archives.

Version 9.1 (released in 2006) introduced fraud protection using technology from GeoTrust, a digital certificate provider, and PhishTank, an organization that tracks known phishing web sites.

Version 9.2, codenamed Merlin, introduced Speed Dial, 3 × 3 small thumbnails which are shown instead of a blank page.

Version 9.5, codenamed Kestrel (after the Kestrel falcon), was released to span the gap between Opera 9.2 and Opera 10. It included some of the rendering improvements due to be made in Opera 10 and also aimed to provide better integration with various operating systems. The first alpha build of Opera 9.5 was released on September 4, 2007. The first public beta was released on October 25, 2007, and the final version was released on June 12, 2008. The final release was downloaded more than 4.5 million times in the first 5 days.

Opera 9.5 has improved support for Cascading Style Sheets (CSS), including many more CSS3 selectors and the CSS2 text-shadow property. Support for other web standards was also improved. For example, Opera 9.5's Scalable Vector Graphics (SVG) implementation supports 93.8% of the W3C's SVG test suite, and built-in support for Animated Portable Network Graphics (APNG) and MathML. Opera 9.5 also supports high-security Extended Validation Certificates and added malware protection through partnership with Haute Secure.

The interface underwent a few alterations as well, using "Sharp" by default, a new skin designed to be more intuitive, though the classic skin was still available as a user preference. Screen reader support has been added back in. Opera's mail client, Opera Mail, has been updated, with an improved indexing feature and many bugfixes. Opera 9.5 also lets users save bookmarks, notes, the Personal Bar and Speed Dial settings to the Opera Link service. These preferences can then be synchronized with another Opera browser, such as a copy of Opera Mini running on a mobile phone.

Alongside the new features, Opera 9.5 had new performance improvements. For example, x64-bit editions of Opera for compatible Linux and BSD operating systems.

Version 9.6 improved Opera Link with the new opportunity to sync custom search engines and typed history. Feed preview and an updated Opera Mail client were additional changes.

=== Version 10 ===
Version 10 (Peregrine) debuted in a first beta version on June 3, 2009 and scored 100/100 on the Acid3 test, but failed the smoothness criteria. There was also a preview build that scored 100/100, released on March 28, 2009. Among other features, it also came with speed optimizations, inline spell checking for forms, an auto update feature, HTML mail formatting, web fonts and SVG font support, alpha transparency support using the RGBA and HSLA color models, and an updated version of the Opera Dragonfly web debugger. Opera Turbo, a mode which uses Opera's servers as proxy servers with data compression, reducing volume of data transferred by up to 80% (depending upon content), and thus increasing speed, was introduced.

Opera 10 was officially released on September 1, 2009. Within a week of release, 10 million downloads had been recorded.

The 10.5x versions (codenamed Evenes) also came with a new JavaScript engine, Carakan, and a new graphics backend dubbed Vega (replacing the previously used Qt), that have increased its speed measurably. Then version 10.60, which Opera Software claims to be 50% faster than Opera 10.50, which also brought up new features like Geolocation, WebM support, AVG malware protection, Speed Dial improvements, etc.

=== Version 11 ===
Opera 11 (codenamed Kjevik) was released on December 16, 2010 with new features including extensions, tab stacking, visual mouse gestures, new installer (Windows only) and safety improvements to the address field. In addition, the content blocker list now can be synchronized through Opera Link. It also passes the Acid3 Test as of January 22, 2011.

On June 28, 2011, Opera 11.50 (codename Swordfish) was released. Equipped with the rendering engine Presto 2.9.168 featuring up to 20% faster rendering of CSS and SVG, support for HTML5 tag <time>, Session History and Navigation, it also features extensions in the Speed Dial, support for password sync in Opera Link and an updated UI.

On December 6, 2011, Opera 11.60 (codename Tunny) was released. Updated with the newest rendering engine Presto 2.10.229, this update features several changes including a UI revamp of the email interface, a new address field with star feature, and several "under the hood" as new HTML5 tags and parsing implementations, full ECMAScript 5.1 support. This version also implemented the JSON API geo-location of Google.

=== Version 12 ===
On June 14, 2012, the final version of Opera 12.00 was released. It offers native 64-bit support, out-of-process plug-ins and experimental hardware acceleration.

On July 4, 2013, Opera 12.16 was released. This was the last release for macOS and Linux to use the Presto layout engine.

On April 23, 2014, Opera 12.17 was released as a platform-specific security update for Windows to fix the Heartbleed bug in the installer and autoupdater of Opera. The browser itself is not threatened by Heartbleed.

On February 16, 2016, Opera 12.18 was released for the Windows platform. It adds support for elliptic curve cryptography (ECC) as well as Galois/Counter Mode (GCM) for encrypted connections to enable Opera 12 to connect to servers that don't allow other encryption modes anymore. In addition a security issue in the mail client was fixed.

== Blink versions ==
On February 12, 2013, Opera Software announced their intention to transition from their Presto layout engine to WebKit, building upon the base of the Chromium project. Opera will become a contributor to the Chromium project. After Google announced its transition of the Chrome/Chromium browser from WebKit to Blink, Opera confirmed it would also switch to Blink instead of WebKit.

The version identifier 13 was skipped, thought to be related to superstition, while 14 was used to refer to a WebKit-based release of Opera for Android.

On May 28, 2013, a beta version of Opera 15 based on Blink was made available for Windows and Mac computers. It removed many distinctive Opera features, including some ubiquitous features like bookmarks (with an expanded Speed Dial intended to replace this feature). The features confirmed to be restored in the near future were synchronization, theme support, geolocation, and a "feature rich" tab bar. The previously bundled M2 email client was released as a standalone application, Opera Mail. Extensions for the previous browser versions are no longer supported; instead developers are provided with facilities for converting old extensions to Chrome extensions, supported in Opera 15.

On July 2, 2013, the final version of Opera 15.0 was released. This release was not pushed through the automatic update system, as it was deemed some features important to current users had yet to be implemented.

On August 8, 2013, Opera 17 entered the Developer stream, reintroducing rocker gestures, tab pinning, start-up options, and search engine management.

Opera 26 was released on December 3, 2014, based on Chromium 39. This is the first new stable version on Linux since 12.16, released on July 4, 2013. This version introduced the ability to import data from other browsers, including bookmarks and passwords. It also features the ability to share selected bookmarks via a URL, and integrated a print preview. Bing was removed from the default search engine list, and can thus no longer be set as the default. This release also transitioned the Mac version of Opera to the 64-bit architecture.

Opera 28 was released on March 10, 2015, based on Chromium 41. Starting with this version, bookmarks can be synchronized between Opera on the desktop, Opera Mobile on Android and Opera Mini on Android and iOS, using the Opera Sync service. The Opera Link service, used with the Presto-based version of Opera and most non-Android/iOS versions of Opera Mini, ceased in December 2015. Support for batch operation was added to the bookmark manager and bookmark suggestions now appear when typing in the address bar.

Opera 38 was released on June 8, 2016, based on Chromium 51. Free unlimited VPN service from Opera was added.

Opera 50 was released on January 4, 2018, based on Chromium 63. It introduces anti-Bitcoin mining tool.

== Release compatibility ==
Operating system		Latest version	Year	Support Date	Engine
Windows	10 and later, Server 2016 and later	140.0.6074.18 (ARM64)	2026	2024–	Blink
Windows	10 and later, Server 2016 and later	140.0.6074.18 (IA-32,x64)	2026	2015–	Blink
Windows	7, Server 2008 R2, 8, Server 2012, 8.1, and Server 2012 R2	95.0.4635.90 (IA-32,x64)	2023	2009–2023	Blink
Windows	XP, Server 2003, Vista, and Server 2008	36.0.2130.80 (IA-32)	2016	2001–2016	Blink
Windows	XP, Server 2003, Vista, and Server 2008	12.18 (x64)	2016	2001–2016	Presto
Windows	2000	12.02	2012	2000–2012	Presto
Windows	Me and NT 4.0 (IA-32)	10.63	2010	1996–2010	Presto
Windows	95 and 98	10.10	2009	1996–2010	Presto
Windows	NT 3.51 (IA-32)	5.12	2001	1996–2001	Elektra
Windows	3.1 and NT 3.1–3.5 (IA-32)	3.62	2000	1996–2000	Elektra
macOS	13 and later	140.0.6074.18 (x64)	2026	2022–	Blink
macOS	12	134.0.5954.66	2026	2021–2026	Blink
macOS	11	122.0.5643.150	2025	2020–2025	Blink
macOS	10.15	114.0.5282.235	2024	2019–2024	Blink
macOS	10.13–10.14	102.0.4880.78	2023	2017–2023	Blink
macOS	10.11–10.12	89.0.4447.91	2022	2015–2022	Blink
macOS	10.10	63.0.3368.107	2019	2014–2019	Blink
macOS	10.9	49.0.2725.64	2017	2013–2017	Blink
macOS	10.7–10.8	37.0.2178.54	2016	2011–2016	Blink
macOS	10.6	25.0.1614.71	2014	2009–2014	Blink
macOS	10.5	12.16 (IA-32,x64)	2013	2007–2013	Presto
macOS	10.4	11.10 (IA-32)	2011	2006–2011	Presto
macOS	10.4–10.5	10.63 (PPC)	2010	2005–2010	Presto
macOS	10.3	10.10	2009	2003–2009	Presto
macOS	10.2	8.54	2006	2002–2006	Presto
macOS	10.1	7.54u2	2005	2002–2005	Presto
macOS	8.0–9.2.2, 10.0	6.03 (PPC)	2003	2002–2004	Elektra
macOS	7.1.2–7.6.1	5.00 (PPC)	2002	2002	Elektra
Linux (X11/Wayland)		140.0.6074.18 (x64)	2026	2008–	Blink
Linux (X11/Wayland)		45.0.2552.898 (IA-32)	2017	2001–2017	Blink
Linux (X11/Wayland)		10.63 (PPC)	2010	2002–2010	Presto
Linux (X11/Wayland)		9.27 (SPARC V9)	2008	2003–2008	Presto
FreeBSD	7 and later	12.16 (IA-32,x64)	2013	2008–2013	Presto
FreeBSD	5	9.64 (x64)	2009	2008–2009	Presto
FreeBSD	5	9.64 (IA-32)	2009	2006–2009	Presto
FreeBSD	4	9.27 (IA-32)	2008	2003–2008	Presto
Solaris		10.11 (IA-32)	2010	2006–2010	Presto
Solaris		10.11 (SPARC V9)	2010	2003–2010	Presto
QNX		5.21 (IA-32)	2001	2001	Elektra
OS/2 and eComStation		5.12 (IA-32)	2001	2001	Elektra
BeOS		3.62 (IA-32)	2000	2001	Elektra

Notes

- Only x86-64 builds of Opera for Mac are available at this time. ARM64 builds should soon be available as the Apple transition to ARM processors continues.

== Discontinued versions for devices ==
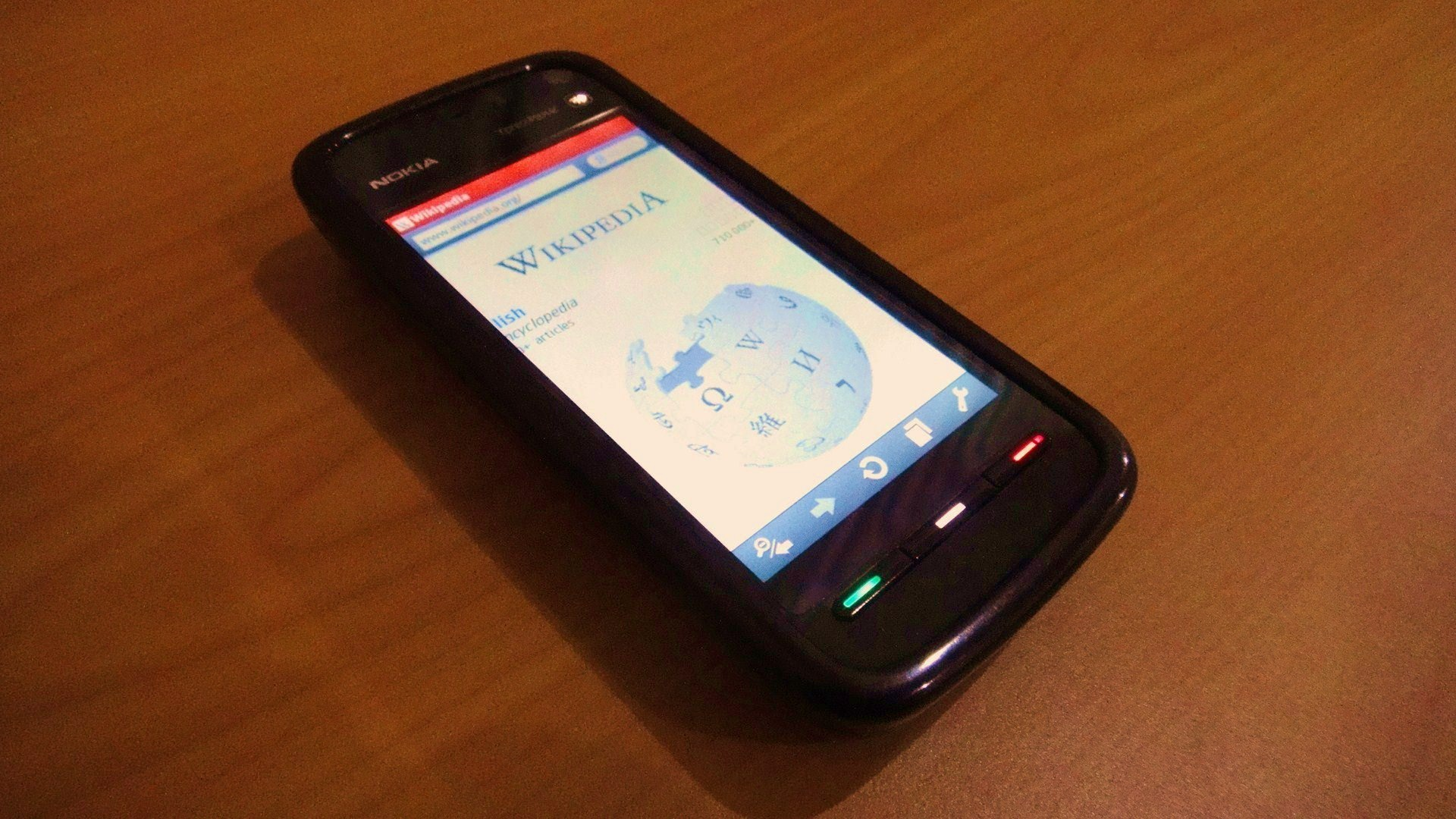
Opera Mobile Classic can be used on smartphones such as the Nokia 5800.

=== Opera Mobile Classic ===
Opera Mobile Classic, formerly called Opera Mobile, is an edition of Opera designed for smartphones and personal digital assistants (PDAs). The first version of Opera Mobile Classic was released in 2000 for the Psion Series 7 and NetBook, with a port to the Windows Mobile platform coming in 2004. One of Opera Mobile Classic's major features is the ability to dynamically reformat web pages to better fit the handheld's display using small screen rendering technology. Alternatively, the user may use page zooming for a closer or broader look. However, Opera Mobile's user interface has come under fire for being difficult to use or customize. Opera Mobile Classic was replaced by Opera browser for Android.

=== Internet Channel for Wii ===
Internet Channel is a web browser for Nintendo's Wii gaming console made by Opera Software and Nintendo. Internet Channel was free to download from its release on 12 April 2007 until 30 June 2007. After that date, Wii users had to pay 500 Wii Points to download it. However, in late August / early September of the year 2009, the Internet Channel was once again available to download for free and those who paid for the service had their Wii Points returned in the form of a free NES Virtual Console game. Scott Hedrick, an executive of the Opera Software company, explained that the Wii browser was designed to suit a "living room environment". In contrast to Opera's appearance on computer monitors, fonts are larger and the interface is simplified for easier use. Notwithstanding the changes in design, the Wii browser supports the same web standards as the desktop version of Opera 9, including passing the Acid2 test.

=== Nintendo DS Browser ===
Nintendo DS Browser is an edition of Opera for the Nintendo DS handheld gaming system. The Nintendo DS Browser was released in Japan on 24 July 2006, in Europe on 6 October 2006, and in North America on 4 June 2007.

The Nintendo DS Browser includes the same small screen rendering and page zooming technology present in Opera Mobile. It also includes handwriting recognition software and an on-screen keyboard to enable user input. Additionally, Nintendo partnered with Astaro Internet Security to provide web filtering for the Nintendo DS Browser. The technology is simply a professionally maintained proxy server that blocks web sites related to pornography, discrimination, security hacking, software piracy, violence, gambling, illegal drugs, alcohol, tobacco, dating, weapons, abortion, and other content that Nintendo deems objectionable. Users can configure the Nintendo DS Browser to receive web pages through this proxy server, and this setting can be password-protected (by a parent, for example) to prevent circumvention. In August 2007, the Nintendo DS Browser was quietly discontinued in North America.
