= PalmPay =

Fintech company

PalmPay Limited
- Native name: Palmpay Limited
- Industry: Banking, Financial Technology
- Founded: 2019; 6 years ago
- Headquarters: Lagos, Nigeria
- Area served: Nigeria, Ghana, Tanzania, Pakistan, Bangladesh and the United Kingdom.
- Key people: Chika Nwosu (Managing Director, PalmPay Nigeria)
- Website: www.palmpay.com

PalmPay Limited, commonly called PalmPay, is a fintech mobile banking company founded in 2019 with headquarter in Ikeja, Lagos State, Nigeria. The company is backed by prominent Chinese investors, including Transsion and NetEase, through the Transsnet joint venture. It is among the four major fintech companies in Nigeria: Moniepoint Inc., Kuda, and Opay.

== History ==
PalmPay launched in Nigeria in 2019 following a US$40 million seed funding round led by Transsion, with participation from NetEase.

PalmPay piloted its service in Nigeria from July 2019, the same month it received approval from the Central Bank of Nigeria to operate as a mobile money operator. During the pilot it registered 100,000 users, according to the company. Its chief executive at launch was Greg Reeve, a former global head of M-Pesa at Vodafone. The company also announced a strategic partnership with Visa and an agreement with Tecno, Infinix and itel to pre-install its app on 20 million phones in 2020.

In August 2021, PalmPay raised a US$100 million Series A round from Chuangshi Capital, Yunshi Equity Investment Management, Trust Capital, Chengyu Capital and the private equity firm AfricInvest. At the time it was the second-largest Series A round in Africa that year. This brought its total funding to almost $140 million.

In 2025, PalmPay reported over 35 million registered users across Nigeria and served approximately one million small and medium-sized business (SME) clients. PalmPay offers peer-to-peer money transfers, bill payments, and financial services through third-party partnerships.

In 2025, PalmPay introduced a debit card in partnership with Verve and integration with its broader suite of financial products.

On 20 August 2025, PalmPay partnered with Nigeria’s Federal Ministry of Youth Development to launch the Youth Data Protection Awareness and Training (YDPAT) programme, which aims to equip Nigerian youths with data-protection and digital-safety skills over three years.

PalmPay's revenue was reported at $64 million in 2023. By mid-2025 the company was profitable, according to people familiar with its finances, and was in talks to raise $50–100 million in a Series B round of equity and debt. That year it also launched in Bangladesh, its first market outside Africa.

In 2026, PalmPay signed an agreement with Hong Kong's Office for Attracting Strategic Enterprises (OASES), making the city the base for its operations outside Africa. In August 2026, media reports said the company was considering an initial public offering in Hong Kong. PalmPay declined to comment.

== Products and services ==
PalmPay's savings and investment products, which let users earn interest and buy treasury bills, are offered through partnerships with Leadway Assurance and ARM. The company says it has more than one million agents and is present in all 774 local government areas of Nigeria. It also offers a cross-border payments service, live in Nigeria, Kenya and Tanzania as of 2025, and announced plans for device financing in Nigeria.

To counter fraud, PalmPay says it uses machine-learning systems to flag unusual transactions, alongside an in-app page for disputing transactions.

== Regulation ==
PalmPay operates under a Mobile Money Operator (MMO) license issued by the Central Bank of Nigeria.

On 29 April 2024, the Central Bank of Nigeria ordered PalmPay, Opay, Kuda Bank and Moniepoint to stop onboarding new customers, following allegations that accounts were being used for illicit foreign-exchange and cryptocurrency trading. The restriction was lifted in June 2024, on condition that the companies block peer-to-peer cryptocurrency transfers and introduce physical address verification and updated facial verification for customers.

== Recognition ==
PalmPay was listed among the world’s top fintech firms by CNBC and Statista, and ranked second in the Financial Times' list of Africa's Fastest-Growing Companies in 2025.

In 2024, it was recognized as one of the Most Outstanding Fintech Company in Financial Inclusion at the Brandcom Awards for its efforts in expanding access to financial services.

In 2026, Time named PalmPay on its TIME100 Most Influential Companies list.

== See also ==
- List of banks in Nigeria
- Mobile payments
