= Opera (web browser) =

Web browser developed by Opera

- Developer: Opera
- Release: 10 April 1995; 31 years ago
- Stable release: 140.0.6074.18 / 10 November 2026; 7 days ago
- Written in: C++
- Engines: Blink, V8
- Operating system: Android 10 and later; iOS 15 and later; iPadOS 15 and later; Linux; macOS 13 and later; Windows 10 and later
- Available in: 42 languages
- Type: Web browser
- License: Freeware
- Website: www.opera.com

Opera is a multi-platform web browser developed by its namesake company Opera. The current edition of the browser is based on Chromium. Opera is available on Windows, macOS, Linux, Android, and iOS (Safari WebKit engine). Opera offers two mobile versions, called Opera Mobile and Opera Mini.

Opera was first developed at Telenor as part of the MultiTorg project. After four beta versions, the first stable version was released on 10 April 1995, making it one of the oldest desktop web browsers to exist. It was commercial software for its first ten years and had its own proprietary layout engine, Presto. In 2013, it switched from the Presto engine to Chromium.

In 2019, Opera introduced Opera GX, a gaming-themed version of Opera with additional gaming-related features. The browser has a feature called mods which made it possible to change the look of the browser with dynamic backgrounds, custom Opera logos, etc.

In 2025, Opera released Opera Air, a more lightweight version of the browser designed with a focus on mindfulness and user well-being. It integrates standard browsing functionalities with tools aimed at reducing digital stress and enhancing productivity.

In the same year, Opera released Opera Neon, an AI agentic browser which has similar functions to ChatGPT Atlas.

== Ownership and location ==
According to Opera Limited's 20-F filing for the fiscal year ending 31 December 2024 to the US Securities and Exchange Commission (required as it is listed on NASDAQ), Opera Limited is incorporated in Cayman Islands, and is a subsidiary of Kunlun Tech Co, which is based in Beijing and listed on the Shenzhen Stock Exchange.

Opera Limited wholly owns Opera Holdings AS, which in turn wholly owns Opera Services AS, which in turn wholly owns Opera Norway AS (all incorporated in Norway). The filing notes "Our corporate headquarters is located in Oslo, Norway. Our principal technical development facilities are located in Wroclaw, Poland; Dundee, Scotland; Beijing, China, and both Linköping and Gothenburg, Sweden".

The filing notes that Opera is owned by Chinese company Kunlun Tech Co: "In 2021, Kunlun, a Chinese public company and our largest investor, increased its ownership stake in us beyond 50%, and as a result we became a consolidated subsidiary of Kunlun … as a subsidiary of Kunlun, we are additionally subject to certain of the listing rules of the Shenzhen Stock Exchange and Chinese corporate governance standards."

James Yahui Zhou, the controlling shareholder of Kunlun, is executive chairman of Opera's board: "As of the date of this annual report, Kunlun, a Chinese public company listed on the Shenzhen Stock Exchange, indirectly owns 68.8% of our issued and outstanding ordinary shares. As such, we are a consolidated subsidiary of Kunlun."

== History ==
In 1994, Jon Stephenson von Tetzchner and Geir Ivarsøy started developing the Opera web browser while working at Telenor, a Norwegian telecommunications company.

In 1995, they founded Opera Software AS. Opera was initially released on 10 April 1995, and then it was released publicly in 1996 with version 2.10, which ran on Microsoft Windows 95. Development for mobile device platforms started in 1998.

Opera 4.0, released in 2000, included a new cross-platform core that facilitated the creation of editions of Opera for multiple operating systems and platforms.

To this point, Opera was trialware and had to be purchased after the trial period. With version 5.0, released in 2000, Opera became ad-sponsored, displaying ads to users who had not paid for it. Subsequent versions have given users the choice of seeing banner ads or targeted text ads from Google.

With version 8.5, released in 2005, the ads were completely removed, and the browser's primary financial support came through revenue from Google (by contract, Opera's default search engine).

Among new features introduced in version 9.1, released in 2006, was fraud protection using technology from GeoTrust, a digital certificate provider, and PhishTank, an organization that tracks known phishing websites. This feature was further expanded in version 9.5, when GeoTrust was replaced with Netcraft, and malware protection from Haute Secure was added.

In 2006, Nintendo released the Nintendo DS Browser and Internet Channel for Nintendo's DS and Wii gaming systems, respectively, which were Opera-based browsers.

A new JavaScript engine, called Carakan (after the Javanese alphabet), was introduced with version 10.50. According to Opera Software, it made Opera 10.50 more than seven times faster in SunSpider than Opera 10.10.

On 16 December 2010, Opera 11 was released, featuring extensions, tab stacking (where dragging one tab over another allowed creating a group of tabs), visual mouse gestures and changes to the address bar. Opera 12 was released on 14 June 2012.

On 12 February 2013, Opera Software announced that it would drop its own Presto layout engine in favor of WebKit as implemented by Google's Chrome browser, using code from the Chromium project. Opera Software planned as well to contribute code to WebKit. On 3 April 2013, Google announced it would fork components from WebKit to form a new layout engine, Blink. That day, Opera Software confirmed it would follow Google in implementing Blink.

On 28 May 2013, a beta release of Opera 15 was made available, the first version based on the Chromium project. Many distinctive Opera features of the previous versions were dropped, and Opera Mail was separated into a standalone application derived from Opera 12.

In 2016, Opera was acquired by an investment group led by a Chinese consortium; the consortium included several Chinese companies such as Kunlun Tech and Qihoo 360. On 27 July 2018, Opera Software went public on the NASDAQ stock exchange, raising $115 million in its initial public offering. Opera began repurchasing its shares in 2022 following the closure of 360 Security Technology Inc. that year.

In January 2017, the source code of Opera 12.15, one of the last few versions still based on the Presto layout engine, was leaked. The source code of Presto, which is proprietary software, was uploaded to GitHub on 13 January, but was taken down four days later after Opera Software lawyers issued a DMCA notice. The code repository was later reuploaded to Bitbucket. It was later taken down there too, and the Bitbucket repository now returns a 404.

To demonstrate how radically different a browser could look, Opera Neon, dubbed a "concept browser", was released in January 2017. PC World compared it to demo models that automakers and hardware vendors release to show their visions of the future. Instead of a Speed Dial Browsing feature it displays the frequently accessed websites in resemblance to a desktop with computer icons scattered over it in an artistic formation.

On 10 May 2017, Opera 45 was released. Notably this was the last version of the browser compatible with 32-bit Linux distributions, with later versions requiring a 64-bit Linux distribution. This version, inspired by the previous Opera Neon design, was called "Opera Reborn" and redoes parts of the user interface, such as adding light and dark modes, and integrates the messenger applications Facebook Messenger, WhatsApp, and Telegram. Additionally, new ad-blocking settings were added along with security changes.

On 4 January 2018, Opera 50 was released. This version updated the browser to utilize the built-in ad blocker to provide cryptocurrency mining protection that stops sites from running scripts that attempt to use the CPU to mine cryptocurrency. Additionally the browser added Chromecast support, VR support enhancements, saving pages as PDFs, and improved VPN performance with region-based locations rather than country-based.

On 9 April 2019, Opera 60 was released. This version, codenamed Reborn 3, focused on moving the browser towards a more minimal design, further improving the free VPN service, and was marketed as being the "World's first Web3 ready browser", as it included out-of-the-box integrations with blockchain and cryptocurrency applications.

On 21 May 2019, Opera GX was announced and opened for early access. The only information available in this announcement is that the browser would be a special version of the browser aimed at those who play games. The early-access program was opened on 11 June 2019.

On 24 June 2021, Opera 77, codenamed Opera R5, was released. As one of the larger updates to the browser, it added more music streaming services in the sidebar, integrating native support for Apple Music, Spotify, YouTube Music, Tidal, SoundCloud, and Gaana. The "Pinboards" feature was also added, letting users create a shareable collection of websites, images, links, and notes in a visual form. A video popout feature was also added for video conferencing, which happens automatically when switching tabs, popping out of the window when navigating away and popping back in when navigating back. Later, in Opera 83 released on 19 January 2022, this feature would be implemented for all video players, not just video conferencing platforms.

In April 2022, Opera launched VPN Pro, a paid, device-wide VPN service, initially as a beta for Android. Unlike Opera's free browser VPN, VPN Pro protects traffic from applications across the device and was later expanded to Windows and macOS.

On 31 Jan 2023, Opera announced that given the discontinuation of support for Windows 7 and 8.1 by Microsoft, Chromium based browsers are also ending support, so Opera will no longer get updates on those versions, but older versions will continue to function on those versions of Windows.

On 22 March 2023, Opera and Opera GX incorporated features with AI-powered tools. These features include AI Prompts that are suggested to the user, and sidebar access to ChatGPT and ChatSonic. The prompts show up on sites that contain content like articles, offering to shorten the text or summarize them.

On 20 June 2023, Opera launched Opera 100, codenamed Opera One, a version of the browser built from the ground up around AI which was unveiled on 25 April 2023. This browser includes a native AI called Aria, a GPT-based AI engine that was developed collaboratively with OpenAI that sifts through web information, generates text and code, and more. Tab islands were also introduced, allowing browser tabs to be grouped together, bookmarked, collapsed, and more. Major UI changes were made, and a Multithreaded Compositor was introduced, allowing the browser to function and render animations much more smoothly than it was previously capable. In February 2025, the platform launched a preview of its Browser Operator, an AI assistant that handles browsing tasks for users. In May 2025, Opera Neon is introduced, which is an AI browser designed to understand user's intent, assist with tasks, and take actions.

== Features ==
Opera has originated features later adopted by other web browsers, including: Speed Dial, pop-up blocking, reopening recently closed pages, private browsing, and tabbed browsing. Additional features include a built-in screenshot tool, Snapshot, which also includes an image-markup tool; built-in ad blockers, and tracking blockers.

=== Built-in messengers ===
Opera's desktop browser includes access to social media messaging apps WhatsApp, Discord, Telegram, Facebook Messenger, X (Formerly Twitter), Instagram, Bluesky, Slack, TikTok, and VK.

=== Usability and accessibility ===
Opera includes a bookmarks bar and a download manager. It also has "Speed Dial" which allows the user to add an unlimited number of pages shown in thumbnail form in a page displayed when a new tab is opened.

Opera was one of the first browsers to support Cascading Style Sheets (CSS) in 1998.

Opera Turbo, a feature that compresses requested web pages (except HTTPS pages) before sending them to the users, is no longer available on the desktop browser. Opera Turbo is available in Opera Mini, the mobile browser.

=== Privacy and security ===
One security feature is the option to delete private data, such as HTTP cookies, browsing history, items in cache and passwords with the click of a button.

When visiting a site, Opera displays a security badge in the address bar which shows details about the website, including security certificates. Opera's fraud and malware protection warns the user about suspicious web pages and is enabled by default. It checks the requested page against several databases of known phishing and malware websites, called blacklists.

In 2016, a free virtual private network (VPN) service was implemented in the browser. Opera said that this would allow encrypted access to websites otherwise blocked, and provide security on public WiFi networks. Security experts at Deloitte inspected Opera VPN's technical infrastructure to ensure users' data linked to their activities is never stored or logged as stated in Opera's no-log policy.

In July 2026, Opera introduced Paste Protect, a security feature designed to protect against clipboard-based attacks such as ClickFix. It monitors content copied to the clipboard for potentially malicious commands and blocks suspicious content before it can be pasted, while also warning the user.

=== Crypto-wallet support ===
In 2018, a built-in cryptocurrency wallet for the Opera browser was released, with an announcement that Opera would be the first browser with such a feature. On 13 December 2018, Opera released a video showing many decentralized applications like Cryptokitties running on the Android version of the Opera Web Browser.

In March 2020, Opera updated its Android browser to access .crypto domains (IPFS), making it the first browser to be able to support a domain name system (DNS) which is not part of the traditional DNS directly without the need of a plugin or add-on. This was through a collaboration with a San Francisco–based startup, Unstoppable Domains. In 2021 iOS and desktop versions have support for IPFS.

In January 2022, Opera introduced Opera Crypto Browser into public beta, combining a non-custodial wallet with a dedicated browser for blockchain-enabled services and Web3 technologies. On 14 April 2022, Opera launched its Crypto Browser available on iOS devices. As of 2023, Opera Crypto Browser has been discontinued, with the browser's features being integrated into Opera and Opera GX.

=== AI chatbot ===
In 2023, Opera added an AI chatbot called Aria into the browser. This is powered by Opera's Composer AI engine and connects to OpenAI's GPT model.

== Other versions ==
=== Opera GX ===
Opera GX

- A screenshot of Opera GX on Windows 11
- Developer: Opera
- Release: 11 June 2019; 7 years ago

Stable release(s)
- Windows: 133.0.5932.18 / 2 July 2026; 4 months ago
- macOS: 133.0.5932.18 / 2 July 2026; 4 months ago
- Android: 3.3.4 / 7 July 2026; 4 months ago
- iOS, iPadOS: 3.3.0 / 5 July 2026; 4 months ago
- Engines: Blink (WebKit on iOS/iPadOS), V8
- Operating system: Android 10 and later; iOS 17 and later; iPadOS 17 and later; macOS 13 and later; Windows 10 and later; Linux
- Type: Web browser
- License: Freeware
- Website: www.opera.com/gx

Opera GX is a gaming-oriented alternative to Opera. The browser was announced on 21 May 2019 and released in early access for Windows on 11 June 2019, during E3 2019. The macOS version was released in December of the same year.

Opera GX adds features geared toward gamers and other audiences, with the regular Opera browser features included. The limiter allows users to limit network, CPU, and memory usage to preserve system resources. GX Cleaner is a tool that is said to allow users to clear cache, cookies, and other unwanted files etc. The browser also adds integrations with other websites such as Twitch, Discord, Twitter, and Instagram. The browser also has a built-in page called the GX Corner, which combines gaming-related releases, deals, and news articles.

On 5 September 2019, Opera won a Red Dot award in the Interface and User Experience Design category for Opera GX. Around the same time, Opera GX also marked its first one million downloads.

On 20 May 2021, a mobile version of Opera GX was released on iOS and Android.

On 12 November of the same year, Opera GX Mobile was awarded another Red Dot award in both the Apps category and the Interface and User Experience Design: Mobile UIs category.

On 19 August 2023, Opera GX introduced a VTuber named GX Aura for their social media accounts; she later became the mascot for the browser.

On 28 November of the same year, Opera GX launched a new advertising campaign titled "Bury Boring", featuring actor and comedian Eric André smashing and burying computers not using Opera GX.

On 19 March 2026, Opera GX released for Linux.

=== Opera Air ===
Opera Air
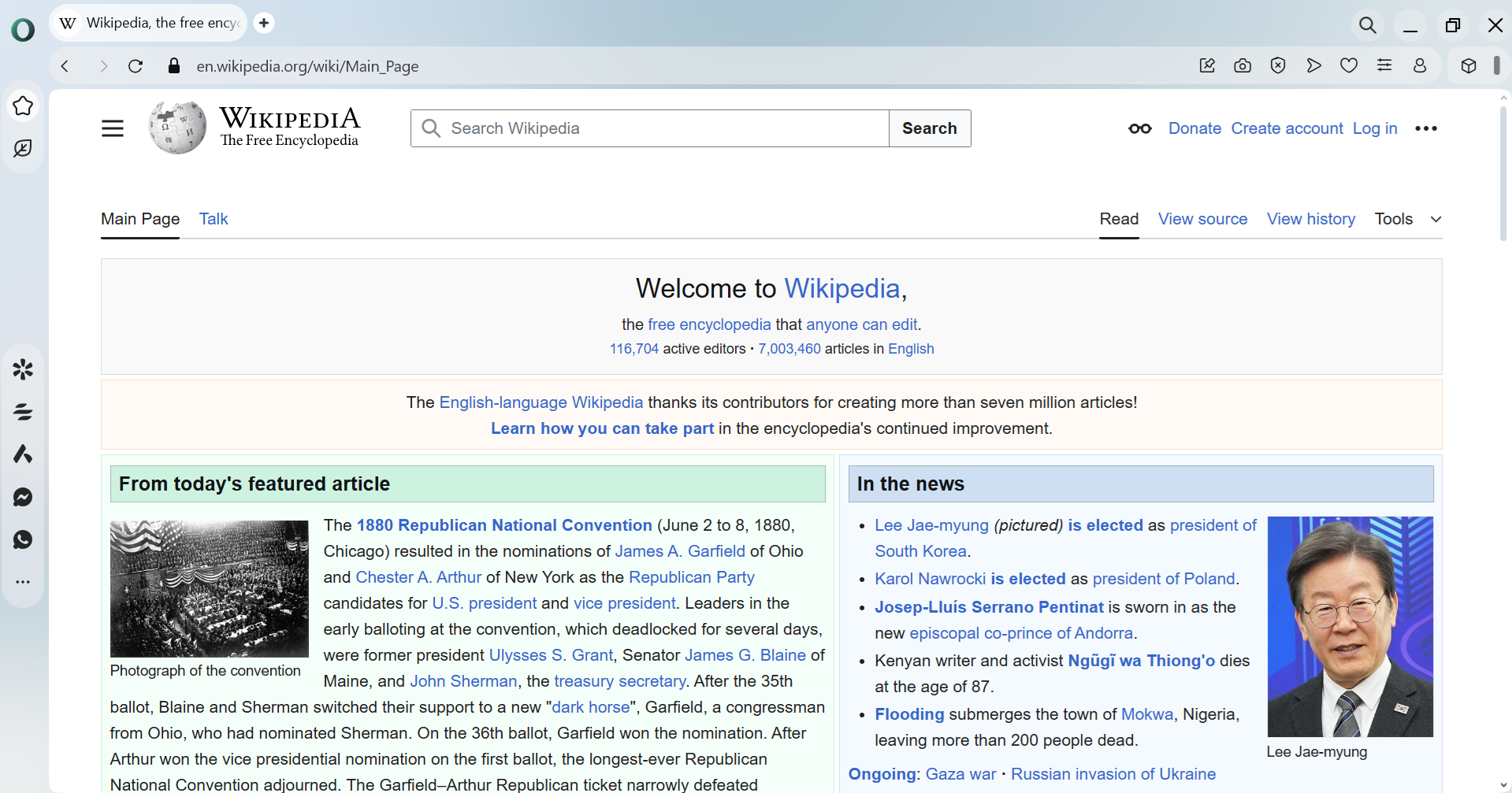
- Screenshot of Opera Air on Windows 11
- Developer: Opera
- Release: 4 February 2025; 21 months ago
- Engine: Blink
- Operating system: macOS 13 and later; Windows 10 and later
- Type: Web browser
- License: Freeware
- Website: www.opera.com/air

Opera Air is a web browser released by Opera in February 2025. It has features that focus on mindfulness and relaxation to combat doomscrolling. The browser incorporates tools for relaxation and focus, such as Take-a-break reminders, customizable meditation and stretching exercises, and a Boosts feature that plays ambient sounds, music, and binaural beats. These tools and exercises are in the browser's sidebar.

=== Opera Neon ===
Opera Neon
- Developer: Opera
- Release: Late 2025
- Engine: Blink
- Operating system: MacOS 13 or later Windows 10 or later
- Available in: English; French; German
- License: Freeware
- Website: www.operaneon.com

Opera Neon is an AI-powered and agentic browser released in late 2025 that acts as a personal assistant, researching, creating websites, generating code, and managing all complex tasks on the user's behalf, The browser is a "testing ground" for advanced AI tools, featuring auto-tab management, built-in VPN, and integration with high-end AI models like GPT-5.1.

== Development stages ==
Opera Software uses a release cycle consisting of three "streams", corresponding to phases of development, that can be downloaded and installed independently of each other: "developer", "beta", and "stable". New features are first introduced in the developer build, then, depending on user feedback, may progress to the beta version and eventually be released.

The developer stream allows early testing of new features, mainly targeting developers, extension creators, and early adopters. Opera developer is not intended for everyday browsing as it is unstable and is prone to failure or crashing, but it enables advanced users to try out new features that are still under development, without affecting their normal installation of the browser. New versions of the browser are released frequently, usually a few times a week.

The beta stream, formerly known as "Opera Next", is a feature complete package, allowing stability and quality to mature before the final release. A new version is released every couple of weeks. Both streams can be installed alongside the official release without interference. Each has a different icon to help the user distinguish between the variants.

== Market adoption ==
Desktop/laptop browser statistics
Google Chrome	72.59%
Microsoft Edge	10.49%
Mozilla Firefox	6.02%
Safari	5.14%
Opera	1.78%
Other	3.59%
Desktop web browser market share according to StatCounter for June 2026

=== Integrations ===
In 2005, Adobe Systems integrated Opera's rendering engine, Presto, into its Adobe Creative Suite applications. Opera technology was employed in Adobe GoLive, Adobe Photoshop, Adobe Dreamweaver, and other components of the Adobe Creative Suite. Opera's layout engine is also found in Virtual Mechanics SiteSpinner Pro. The Internet Channel is a version of the Opera 9 web browser for use on the Nintendo Wii created by Opera Software and Nintendo. Opera Software is also implemented in the Nintendo DS Browser and Nintendo DSi Browser for Nintendo's handheld systems.

As of April 2021, Opera's offerings had over 320 million active users.

== Reception ==
Versions with the Presto layout engine have been positively reviewed, although they have been criticized for website compatibility issues. Because of this issue, Opera 8.01 and higher had included workarounds to help certain popular but problematic web sites display properly.

Versions with the Blink layout engine have been criticized by some users for missing features such as UI customization, and for abandoning Opera Software's own Presto layout engine. Despite that, versions with the Blink layout engine have been noted for being fast and stable, for handling the latest web standards and for having a better website compatibility and a modern-style user interface.

== See also ==
Opera browser platform variants:

- Opera Mini: a browser for tablets and telephones
- Opera Mobile: a browser for tablets and telephones

Related other browsers:

- Brave: open-source privacy-focused browser
- Otter Browser: an open-source browser that recreates some aspects of the classic Opera
- Vivaldi: a freeware browser created by the former CEO of Opera Software and former Opera Software employees

Related topics:

- History of the web browser
- List of pop-up blocking software
- List of web browsers
- Timeline of web browsers
