= List of banks in Nigeria =

This is a list of commercial banks and other credit institutions within Nigeria. Following the 2026 recapitalization exercise mandated by the Central Bank of Nigeria, the sector's total assets grew to approximately ₦255 trillion. Deposits are protected by the Nigeria Deposit Insurance Corporation (NDIC) up to ₦5,000,000 per depositor.

== List of commercial banks ==
- Access Bank plc, part of Access Bank Group
- Alpha Morgan Bank
- Citibank Nigeria Ltd, part of Citigroup
- Ecobank Nigeria Plc, part of Ecobank Group
- Fidelity Bank Plc
- First Bank Nigeria Ltd, part of First Bank of Nigeria Group
- First City Monument Bank Plc
- Globus Bank Ltd
- Guaranty Trust Bank Plc, part of GTCO Group
- Keystone Bank Ltd
- Nova Commercial Bank Ltd
- Optimus Bank
- Parallex Bank Ltd
- Polaris Bank Plc
- Premium Trust Bank
- Providus Bank Ltd
- Signature Bank Ltd
- Stanbic IBTC Bank Plc, part of Stanbic IBTC Holdings
- Standard Chartered Bank Nigeria Ltd, part of Standard Chartered Group
- Sterling Bank Plc
- Summit Bank
- SunTrust Bank Nigeria Ltd
- Tatum Bank
- The Alternative Bank Ltd
- Titan Trust Bank Ltd
- Union Bank of Nigeria Plc
- United Bank For Africa Plc, part of UBA Group
- Unity Bank Plc
- Wema Bank Plc
- Zenith Bank Plc

== Development Finance Institutions ==
- Bank of Agriculture
- Bank of Industry
- Development Bank of Nigeria
- Federal Mortgage Bank of Nigeria
- Nigerian Export-Import Bank
- The Infrastructure Bank

== Financial holding companies ==
- Access Holdings PLC, parent of Access Bank Group
- FBN Holdings PLC, parent of First Bank of Nigeria Group
- FCMB Group PLC, parent of First City Monument Bank
- FSDH Holding Company, parent of FSDH Merchant Bank
- GTB Holding Company, parent of GTCO Group
- Stanbic IBTC Holdings PLC, intermediate holding of Standard Bank Group
- Sterling Financial Holdings Ltd, parent of Sterling Bank

== Non-interest banks ==
- The Alternative Bank Limited
- Jaiz Bank Plc
- Lotus Bank Ltd
- TAJBank
- Summit Bank

== Microfinance banks ==
N.B. This section was not updated per the full CBN list of 2024.

Bricks and mortar

1. Auchi Polytechnic Microfinance Bank
2. Mutual Trust Microfinance Bank
3. Rephidim Microfinance Bank
4. Shepherd Trust Microfinance Bank
5. Empire Trust Microfinance Bank
6. Finca Microfinance Bank Limited
7. Moneyfield Microfinance Bank
8. Accion Microfinance Bank
9. Peace Microfinance Bank
10. Infinity Microfinance Bank
11. Covenant Microfinance Bank Ltd
12. Solid Allianze Microfinance Bank
13. Advans La Fayette Microfinance Bank
14. lapo mfb
15. mainstreet mfb
16. pecan trust mf bank

Online only

1. FairMoney Microfinance Bank
2. Sparkle Bank
3. Kuda Bank
4. Moniepoint Microfinance Bank
5. Opay wallet
6. Dot Microfinance Bank
7. PalmPay
8. Rubies Bank
9. Pryme App
10. VFD Microfinance Bank
11. Mint Finex MFB
12. Mkobo MFB
13. Raven Bank
14. Rex Microfinance Bank
15. CashX
16. Wayve Microfinance Bank

== See also ==
- Economy of Nigeria
- List of banks in Africa
