= Expansion pack (disambiguation) =

An expansion pack is an addition to an existing game.

Expansion pack or Expansion Pak may refer to:

- Expansion Pak, a Nintendo 64 accessory that enhances many of the system's games, and is required for a few games
- Memory Expansion Pak, a Nintendo DS accessory that adds 8 MB of system memory, and is required for the web browser
- Expansion Pack, a Nintendo Switch Online subscription tier which grants access to additional game systems for the Nintendo Classics service
