= Zhou Yahui =

Chinese billionaire entrepreneur (born 1977)

- 周亚辉
- Born: February 1977 (age 49); Lijiang, Yunnan, China
- Education: Tsinghua University
- Occupations: Chairman and CEO of Kalends Inc. CEO of Opay; Executive chairman of Opera
- Known for: Founder of Kalends Inc. and Beijing Kunlun Tech Co., Inc.
- Spouse: Li Qiong (divorced)

Zhou Yahui (Chinese: 周亚辉; born February 1977) is a Chinese billionaire and entrepreneur. In 2008, he founded Kunlun Tech Co Ltd (formerly Beijing Kunlun Tech Co Ltd) one of the largest web game developers in China, where he was the chairman and CEO until 2020. Zhou currently serves as executive chairman of Opera. As of 2019 he had an estimated net worth of some US$2.2 billion.

== Early life ==
Zhou was born in February 1977 in Lijiang, China. In 1999 he received a bachelor's degree in mechanical engineering and a master's degree in optical engineering in 2006, both from Tsinghua University in Beijing.

== Career ==
Zhou's career started in 1999 when he started a website called Vulcan Net funded by Tsinghua University. Vulcan Net was a website dedicated to uploading animations made by people in the local area, especially students in the university. Zhou and Tsinghua University closed Vulcan Net sometime in 2004 due to unprofitability.

Zhou became an executive manager for the social networking service Renren in November 2005. In March 2007, he stopped working for Renren when he became the general manager of Beijing JiNaiTe Technology Co, Ltd. Zhou worked for JiNaiTe Tech as General Manager from March 2007 to March 2008 until he founded his own company, Kunlun Tech Co Ltd.

Zhou served as executive director and general manager of Kunlun from March 2008 to March 2011; from March 2011 his roles were chairman and CEO. The company changed its official name to Beijing Kunlun Tech Co Ltd also in March 2011. Zhou is the main owner of the company with 30% of shares. In 2015, the company went public on the Shenzhen Stock Exchange.

Beijing Kunlun focuses on the distribution and sale of video games in China through their GameArk application.

Beijing Kunlun finalized its purchase of a 60% controlling stake in the gay dating app Grindr in January 2016.

Also in early 2016, a consortium of investors including Beijing Kunlun acquired Opera Software; Beijing Kunlun's 48% stake gave it (and Zhou Yahui) effective control of Opera. Zhou serves as executive chairman of Opera and served as CEO from 2016 to 2025.

In January 2018, Zhou became interim CEO of Grindr.

In March 2019, the Committee on Foreign Investment in the United States (CFIUS) required Beijing Kunlun Tech Co Ltd to divest its ownership of Grindr following a regulatory review of the acquisition under U.S. foreign investment rules. As a result, Kunlun began seeking a buyer for the company. Regulatory analysts have highlighted that divestments following CFIUS reviews often reflect jurisdiction-specific national security frameworks rather than findings of misconduct. In March 2020, Grindr was sold to San Vicente Acquisition LLC for approximately $608 million.

On 13 April 2020, it was announced that Zhou Yahui would resign as chairman of Beijing Kunlun due to the COVID-19 pandemic. He resigned in order to focus on his e-commerce and payment platform Opay, a fintech company incubated by Opera which is based in Africa and primarily used in Nigeria. He was replaced by Wang Liwei.

== Personal life ==
Zhou was married to Li Qiong, his elementary school classmate. They divorced in September 2016, with Li Qiong awarded $1.1 billion worth of Beijing Kunlun shares, making it one of the most expensive divorce settlements in China.
