= TAJBank =

Financial institute

TAJBank Limited
- Type: Private
- Industry: Banking
- Founded: 2019
- Headquarters: Abuja, Nigeria
- Key people: Alhaji Tanko Isiaku Gwamna(Chairman), Hamid Joda (Founder, Managing Director/ Chief Executive Officer), Sherif Idi (Co Founder & Executive Director)
- Products: Savings Account (Mudarabah), Current Account (Qard)Term Deposit Account, Sales Products, Leasing Products, Partnership Products (Financing)
- Total assets: N50 billion (2020)
- Website: www.tajbank.com

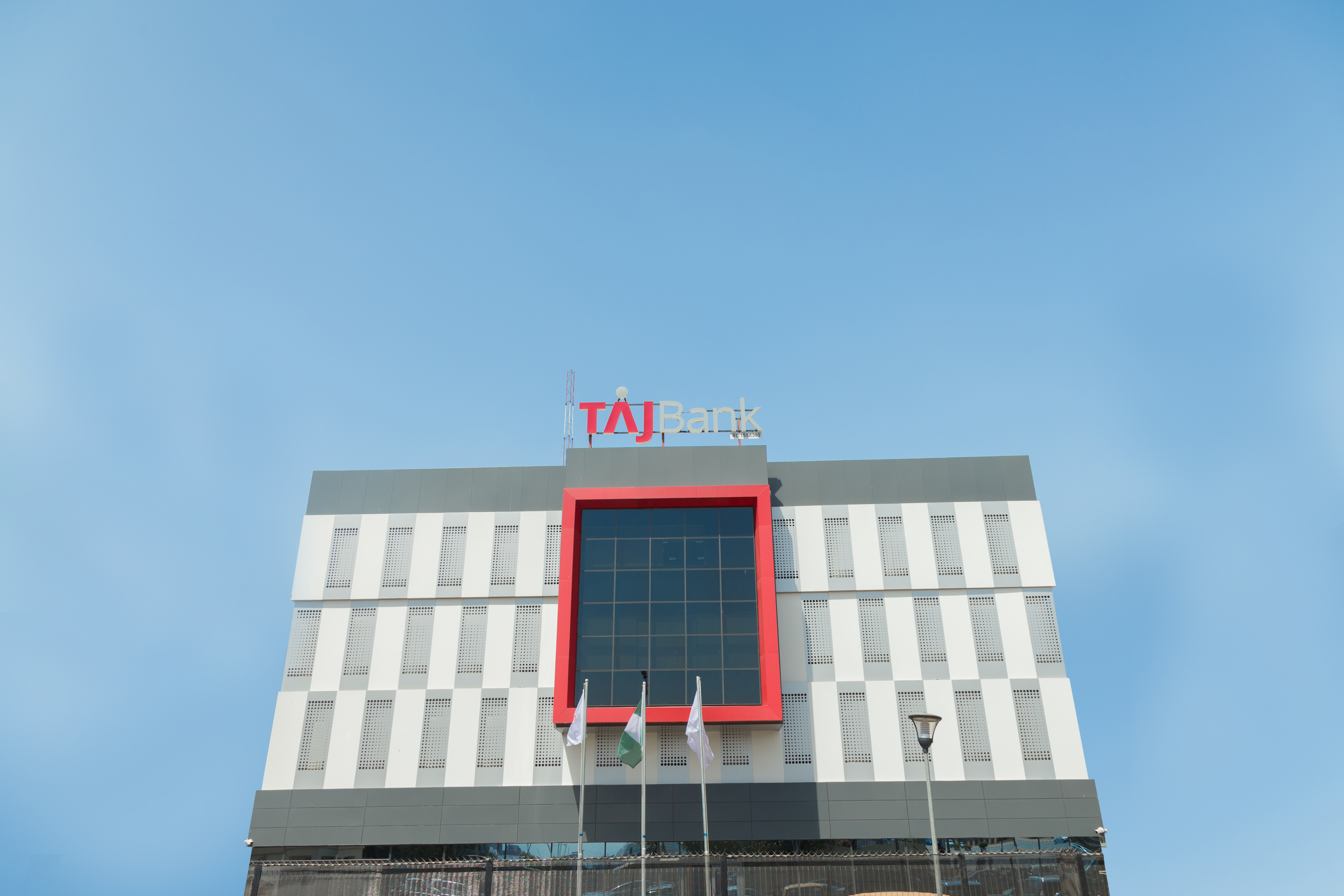

TAJBank Limited, is Nigeria's second Non-interest bank, operating under Islamic banking principles, established in Nigeria with its headquarters in Abuja, the capital city of the country.

The Bank operates 45 branches, 5 cash centers and provides regular ATM services as well as Online, Mobile, USSD (*898#) and SMS banking services.

== History ==
The institution was founded in 2019, as TAJBank Limited. On 3 July 2019, TAJBank received a license from the Central Bank of Nigeria, the national banking regulator, to operate as a regional bank. On 2 December 2019, the institution commenced business as TAJBank Limited in offices and branches in Abuja.

On 12 December 2019, TAJBank opened its second branch at Kano in the process of expanding to other urban centers in the Federal Republic of Nigeria. TAJBank recorded its early success in August 2022 culminating in the issuance of a National License by the Central Bank of Nigeria.

The Bank also opened a branch in Sokoto State on the 24th of August 2020. TAJBank has over 38(Thirty-eight) branches nationwide.

On February 14, 2023 TAJBank listed its N10billion Mudarabah Sukuk issuance at the Nigerian Exchange Limited (NGX)

== Ownership ==
=== The Board of Directors of the bank are listed below. ===
Taj Bank Limited Board of Directors
Rank	Name	Position
1	Alhaji Tanko Isiaku Gwamna	Chairman
2	Hamid Joda	Founder/Managing Director/CEO
3	Sherif Idi	Co-Founder/Executive Director/ECO
4	Ahmed Joda	Non-Executive Director
5	Mariam Ibrahim	Non-Executive Director
6	Barrister Habib Alkali	Non-Executive Director
7	Dr. Nura Manu Soro	Non-Executive Director
8	Charles Ebienang	Non-Executive Director
9	Kogis Jonathan Luka	Non-Executive Director
10	Hafsat Lawal Garba	Non-Executive Director
11	Dr. Jameel Muhammad Sadis	Non-Executive Director
12	Tata Shakarau Omar	Independent Non-Executive Director
13	Adekunle James Awe	Independent Non-Executive Director

== See also ==
- Interest-free economy
- List of banks in Nigeria
