= Geir Ivarsøy =

Norwegian programmer

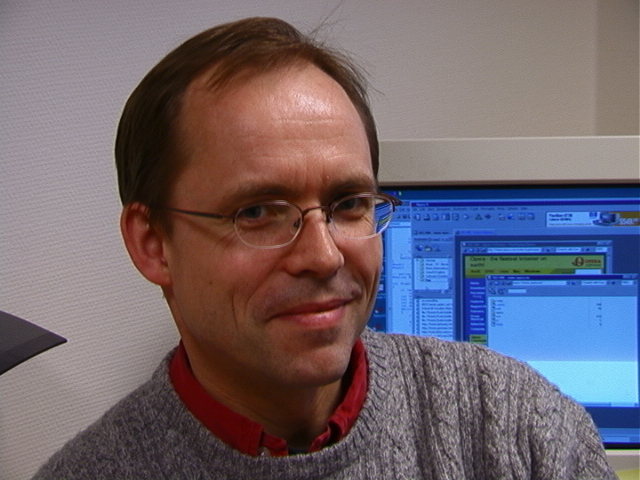
- Born: June 27, 1957; Norway
- Died: March 9, 2006 (aged 48); Oslo
- Occupations: founder and lead programmer of Opera Software
- Website: www.opera.com

Geir Ivarsøy (June 27, 1957 – March 9, 2006) was the lead programmer at Opera Software. He and Jon von Tetzchner were part of a research group at the Norwegian state phone company (now known as Telenor) where they developed browsing software called MultiTorg Opera in 1994. In 1995 Geir and Jon obtained the rights to the software, formed Opera Software, and continued working on the browser full-time.

Now known simply as Opera, the browser has become very popular despite the competition. Opera Software has grown to more than 500 employees since it first moved to its present offices in Oslo.

At a board meeting in January 2004, Geir Ivarsøy announced his wish to resign as a board member in Opera Software, though he remained active in the company even after that. In June 2005, he was elected as a member of the Nomination Committee of the company.

Ivarsøy died in March 2006 of cancer. Opera distributions starting with Version 9 state "In memory of Geir Ivarsøy" on their opera:about page.
