= Opera Coast =

Web browser for Apple devices

- Developer: Opera Software
- Operating system: iOS 7 and later, Android version planned
- Available in: 32 languages
- Type: Mobile browser
- License: Proprietary freeware with open-source components
- Website: Website for Opera Coast - at the Wayback Machine (archived 2014-04-27)

Opera Coast is a discontinued web browser developed for iOS devices by Opera Software. The browser was not based on any former product of Opera and was written from scratch. It was also designed for touch while traditional browser buttons and components such as tabs, history, and bookmarks are eliminated and replaced by gestures.

== History ==
Opera Coast was first released for the iPad on September 9, 2013. An iPhone version followed in April 2014.

In February 2016, Opera announced an Android version of the browser, which was ultimately never released.

Coast was discontinued and removed from the Apple App Store in August 2017.

== Security ==
An embedded security mechanism was implemented in Opera Coast which included several security aspects, like certificates, site reputation, URLs, browsing history, and page content, and the user would be warned if any risk is detected.

== Synchronization ==
Opera Coast was designed to automatically perform synchronization using iCloud. This synchronization kept the tiles on the home screen the same.

== Localization ==
Coast was available in 32 languages.
