= Emmanuel Emefienim =

Nigerian banker

Emmanuel Efe Emefienim, CON
- Born: June 23, 1973 (age 53)
- Education: University of Benin (Nigeria)
- Occupation: Banker

Emmanuel Efe Emefienim, CON is a Nigerian banker. He was Sterling Bank’s Executive Director, Institutional Banking from 2018 till March 2022. He is the founder and CEO of Premium Trust Bank.

== Career ==
Emefienim obtained a Bachelor of Science degree in microbiology and two master's degrees in banking and finance and business administration respectively at University of Benin.

Emefienim started his career in banking at Oceanic Bank Plc (now Ecobank Nigeria) where he worked from 1992 to1997. At Oceanic Bank, he became the Head, Credit & Marketing. From 1997 to 2000, he was Manager, Commercial Banking at United Bank for Africa. For a 6-year period, he worked at Savannah Bank Plc and FSB International (now Fidelity Bank Plc) before joining Equitorial Trust Bank (ETB) in 2006. He became a Zonal Business Director at ETB till it consolidated into Sterling Bank in 2011. Sterling Bank appointed him to the position of Regional Business Executive covering South-South 2 Region, and later on, the South-South 1 region. He then became General Manager in 2016 and got appointed to the Board of Sterling Bank as executive director, Institutional Banking Directorate in 2018. He resigned from Sterling Bank to start Premium Trust Bank in April 2022.
