= Alpha Morgan Bank =

Nigerian commercial bank

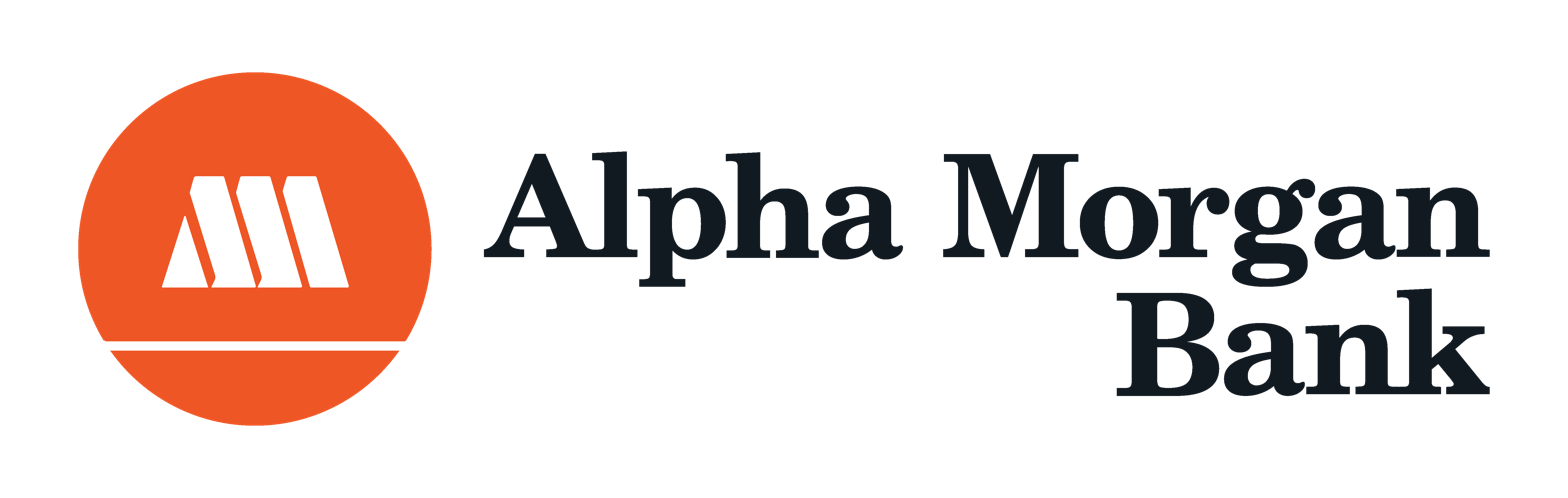
- Type: Private company
- Industry: Finance
- Genre: Banking
- Founded: March 3, 2025; 20 months ago
- Founder: Ade Buraimo
- Headquarters: 52 Adetokunbo Ademola, Victoria Island, Lagos, Nigeria
- Area served: Nigeria
- Key people: Tope Smart (Board Chairman); Ade Buraimo (Group Managing Director); George Imade (Group Head, Investment and Corporate Banking); Adedoyin Anyaehie (Executive Director); Wale Abdul (Chief Financial Officer); Olufunmilayo Adelokun (Chief Audit Executive); Benson Ogunlere (Treasurer); Adedoyin Adepoju (Chief Information officer); Ime Ernest Eyo (Chief risk officer)
- Services: Banking
- Website: www.alphamorganbank.com

Alpha Morgan Bank is a Nigerian commercial bank. Alpha Morgan Bank is licensed by the Central Bank of Nigeria and insured by the Nigeria Deposit Insurance Corporation.

== History ==
=== 2024-2025: Establishment of Alpha Morgan Bank ===
Alpha Morgan Bank was established in 2024 and commenced operations in March 2025 following regulatory approval from the Central Bank of Nigeria.

=== Early development ===
Alpha Morgan Bank emerged from Alpha Morgan Capital, an investment banking and asset management firm operating within Nigeria's capital market sector. The commercial bank drew from the operations and market presence established by Alpha Morgan Capital, which had operated for more than a decade prior to the establishment of the bank.

Alpha Morgan Capital was recognised in the Financial Times ranking of Africa's fastest-growing companies and received credit ratings from Agusto & Co and DataPro.

Following its establishment, Alpha Morgan Bank stated that it would provide banking services to individuals, small and medium-sized enterprises, corporate organisations, and public sector institutions. The bank commenced operations with fourteen approved branches across Nigeria and established its headquarters in Abuja.

=== Leadership and strategic direction ===
The expansion into commercial banking occurred under the leadership of Ade Buraimo, founder and Group Managing Director of the Alpha Morgan Bank, who completed the three-year Owner/President Management (OPM) program at Harvard Business School. Under his direction and other management team, the organization pursued a diversification strategy aimed at integrating investment banking expertise with retail and corporate banking services

=== Digital Banking ===
Following its launch in 2025, Alpha Morgan Bank began rolling out digital banking services and expanding its branch network in major Nigerian cities. The bank introduced mobile and USSD banking platforms to improve access to financial services and support financial inclusion initiatives.

=== 2026 CBN Recapitalisation ===
In March 2024, the Central Bank of Nigeria (CBN) introduced a new recapitalisation framework for the banking sector, requiring banks to significantly increase their minimum capital base by March 31, 2026. Under the policy, the capital threshold was raised to ₦500 billion for commercial banks with international authorisation, ₦200 billion for those with national authorisation, and ₦50 billion for regional banks. The exercise was designed to strengthen the resilience of the financial system and support Nigeria's objective of becoming a $1 trillion economy.

On March 7, 2025, Alpha Morgan Bank announced that it had met the new minimum capital requirements. The CBN subsequently affirmed the bank's capitalisation, marking a milestone in its strategic expansion. Following the affirmation, the bank's Managing Director, Ade Buraimo, stated that the milestone would enable the institution to scale its operations across its 14 approved branches and invest further in digital banking infrastructure.

=== Financial Performance ===
In its first 10 months of operations ending 31 December 2025, Alpha Morgan Bank reported a Profit Before Tax (PBT) of ₦1.9 billion and a Profit After Tax (PAT) of ₦1.14 billion, according to its audited financial statements. The bank also recorded total assets of approximately ₦160.4 billion during the period. The performance was described by Business Post as a historic milestone for the newly established lender.

== Location ==
Alpha Morgan Bank head office is located at 52 Adetokunbo Ademola, Victoria Island, Lagos, Nigeria and has branches across Nigeria (Abuja, Ibadan, Port Harcourt, Osogbo, Ojodu, Sango Ota etc.)

== See also ==
- List of banks in Nigeria
