= Lotus Bank =

Commercial Institute in Nigeria

LOTUS Bank Limited
- Type: Private company
- Industry: Banking
- Founded: 2021
- Headquarters: Lagos, Nigeria
- Number of locations: 53 branches (2024)
- Key people: Hajara Adeola (chairman), Dr. Isiaka Ajani-Lawal (managing director and chief executive officer)
- Products: Savings account (Mudaraba); Current account (Qard); Term Deposit account; Sales Products; Leasing Products; Partnership Products (financing)
- Number of employees: 300 - 500
- Website: lotusbank.com

LOTUS Bank is a non-interest and ethical bank in Nigeria. It is the third non-interest bank established in Nigeria and the first that started operations from the southern part of the country headquartered in Lagos.

== History ==
The institution was founded in 2021, as Lotus Bank Limited. On 17 June 2021, Lotus Bank limited received a license from the Central Bank of Nigeria, the national banking regulator, to operate as a non-interest bank. On 7 July 2021, the institution commenced operations in 3 branches in Lagos.

== See also ==
- List of banks in Nigeria
- Islamic banking
- Interest-free economy
- Economy of Nigeria
