= Kuda Bank =

UK financial services company

Kuda
- Native name: Kuda Technologies
- Industry: Banking
- Founded: 2019; 7 years ago
- Founders: Babs Ogundeyi; Musty Mustapha
- Headquarters: London, United Kingdom
- Key people: Babs Ogundeyi (CEO); Musty Mustapha (CTO)
- Website: kuda.com

Kuda Technologies, known as Kuda, is a financial technology company headquartered in London and founded by Babs Ogundeyi and Musty Mustapha in 2019. Kuda operates in Nigeria as Kuda Microfinance Bank under a national microfinance bank license from the Central Bank of Nigeria, with over 7 million customers in the country, and is licensed to provide services in Canada and Tanzania.

== History ==
=== Kuda’s Founding and App Launch (2019) ===
Kuda was founded in 2019 by Babs Ogundeyi and Musty Mustapha. The company launched its banking app, also called Kuda, in August 2019, offering Nigerians zero banking fees and a free debit card. In September of the same year, Kuda announced that it had raised $1.6 million in pre-seed funding.

=== Seed Round, COVID-19 Fund, and Payoneer Partnership (2020) ===
The company followed its 2019 pre-seed fundraise with a $10 million seed round led by Target Global in November 2020.

In May 2020, the company launched a COVID-19 fund to provide relief to vulnerable groups in Lagos, a city of over 20 million people. In the same year, it partnered with Payoneer to facilitate international business payments to Nigeria.

=== Series A, Series B Fundraising, and Visa Card Launch (2021) ===
In February 2021, Kuda processed over $2 billion worth of transactions per month.

In March 2021, Kuda announced a $25 million Series A led by Valar Ventures, followed closely by a $55 million Series B at a $500 million valuation, making it one of Nigeria's earliest unicorn-status digital banks in August, 2021.

In November 2021, Kuda launched its branded Visa cards in Nigeria, switching from being a third-party card provider to a direct issuer of physical and virtual debit cards.

=== Kuda Business Launch and UK Remittance Product (2022-2023) ===
After reaching the six-million-customer milestone in June 2023, Kuda expanded its offerings to sign up business users with the launch of Kuda Business, an all-in-one business manager for Nigerian freelancers and SMEs, in October 2022, providing business banking, invoicing, and API services.

Kuda extended its services outside Nigeria for the first time in November 2022, piloting a remittance product for Nigerians in the UK to make cross-border transfers up to £10,000 at a flat fee of £3.

=== Payment Licenses in Tanzania and Canada (2024) ===
In March 2024, Kuda acquired payment licenses to offer remittance and multicurrency wallet services in Tanzania and Canada, with a focus on operating as a global neobank for Africans.

=== National Microfinance Banking License in Nigeria (2025) ===
In December 2025, Kuda’s Nigerian subsidiary, Kuda Microfinance Bank, was granted a national microfinance banking license by the Central Bank of Nigeria, allowing it to expand physically across the country.

== See also ==
- Economy of Nigeria
- List of banks in Nigeria
