= Development Bank of Nigeria =

- Type: State-owned enterprise
- Industry: Financial services
- Founded: 2015; 11 years ago
- Headquarters: Abuja, Nigeria
- Area served: Nigeria
- Key people: Dr. Tony Okpanachi (Managing Director)
- Products: Loans
- Owner: Federal Government of Nigeria
- Number of employees: 50-100 (2024)
- Website: www.devbankng.com

The Development Bank of Nigeria (DBN) is a wholesale development finance institution established by the Federal Government of Nigeria to serve micro, small, and medium enterprises (MSMEs). It provides funding and risk-sharing facilities to eligible financial intermediaries, which in turn on-lend to MSMEs across the country.

== History ==
DBN was established in 2015. The bank commenced operations with a startup capital of $1.5 billion, sourced from the Federal Government and international development partners, including the World Bank, African Development Bank (AfDB), European Investment Bank (EIB), and French Development Agency (AFD).

Since its inception, DBN has reportedly disbursed over ₦1 trillion to more than 495,000 MSMEs across Nigeria. In 2023 alone, the bank disbursed ₦ 787 billion to over 495,000 MSMEs.

In 2023, DBN raised ₦23 billion in the first tranche of its ₦100 billion bond issuance programme support to MSMEs.

== Operations ==
It operates as a wholesale financial institution, providing funding and risk-sharing facilities to microfinance banks and other financial institutions for on-lending to MSMEs.
