= Premium Trust Bank =

Commercial Bank in Nigeria

- Type: Private
- Industry: Banking
- Founded: 2022; 4 years ago
- Founder: Emmanuel Emefienim
- Headquarters: Nigeria
- Owner: Emmanuel Emefienim

Premium Trust Bank is a Nigerian commercial bank that is licensed by the Central Bank of Nigeria, the national banking regulator. The bank offers personal, corporate, private and SME Banking. As of February 2023, the bank has 8 branches in Nigeria. Premium Trust Bank was founded by Emmanuel Emefienim.

== History ==
Premium Trust Bank started operations in April 2022 with its first branch at Port Harcourt, Rivers State. In July 2022, the bank opened branches in Effurun, Delta State, and Abuja. In February 2023, they opened their 8th branch at Redemption City, Ogun State.

In August 2022, Oluwatobiloba Amusan and Ese Brume were named Brand Ambassadors of Premium Trust Bank after their 100m hurdles world record and women's long jump gold medal respectively at the 2022 Commonwealth Games. After the games, the bank also signed 3-year partnership deal with the Athletics Federation of Nigeria. The Bank held its first Annual General Meeting in Lagos, Nigeria in August 2024; at the meeting, stakeholders were guaranteed of its continual growth and profitability.

== Awards ==
- 2022 - Nigeria's Fastest Growing Bank, BusinessDay BAFI Awards
- 2022 - Bank of The Year 2022 (Sports Development), BusinessDay BAFI Awards
- 2022 - Most Innovative Bank of the Year - Leadership Annual Conferences and Awards
