= Presto (browser engine) =

Defunct browser engine

- Developer: Opera Software ASA
- Stable release: 2.12.423 / 16 March 2015; 11 years ago
- Written in: C++
- Operating system: Linux (non-free repositories) and Windows
- Type: Application framework, Browser engine
- License: Proprietary
- Website: dev.opera.com

Presto was the browser engine of the Opera web browser from the release of Opera 7 on 28 January 2003, until the release of Opera 15 on 2 July 2013, at which time Opera switched to using the Blink engine that was originally created for Chromium. Presto was also used to power the Opera Mini and Opera Mobile browsers.

Presto is a dynamic engine. Web pages can be re-rendered completely or partially in response to DOM events. Its releases saw a number of bug fixes and optimizations to improve the speed of the ECMAScript (JavaScript) engine. It is proprietary and was only available as a part of the Opera browsers.

== ECMAScript engines ==
A succession of ECMAScript engines have been used with Opera. (For the origin of their names, see Cultural notes below.) Pre-Presto versions of Opera used the Linear A engine. Opera versions based on the Core fork of Presto, Opera 7.0 through 9.27, used the Linear B engine. The Futhark engine is used in some versions on the Core 2 fork of Presto, namely Opera 9.5 to Opera 10.10. When released it was the fastest engine around, but in 2008 a new generation of ECMAScript engines from Google (V8), Mozilla (SpiderMonkey), and Apple (JavaScriptCore) took one more step, introducing native code generation. This opened up for potential heavy computations on the client side and Futhark, though still fast and efficient, was unable to keep up.

In early 2009, Opera introduced the Carakan engine. It featured register-based bytecode, native code generation, automatic object classification, and overall performance improvements. Early access in the Opera 10.50 pre-alpha showed that it is as fast as the fastest competitors, being the winner in 2 out of the 3 most used benchmarks.

== History and development ==
Presto Version	ECMAScript engine	Browser code name	Opera Browser	Opera Mobile	Other use	New features
pre Presto	unnamed	unnamed	3.0			The first version to support JavaScript
pre Presto	Linear A	Elektra/unnamed (Note: Elektra was originally the codename of Opera 4.0, but later came to refer more generally to the layout engine used in versions 3.5 through 6.)	4.0			
1.0	Linear B	unnamed	7.0			a completely new rendering engine, Favicon support
1.0	Linear B		8.5			"Bolton" version: 1st completely free download version (ad-free toolbar)
2.0	Linear B	Merlin	9.0		Internet Channel	Canvas, Acid2 Test: passed, Rich text editing, XSLT, and XPath
2.1	Futhark	Kestrel	9.5	9.5	Nintendo DSi Browser	SVG Tiny 1.2, SVG as CSS, SVG as <img>, Audio object
2.1.1	Futhark	Kestrel	9.6			Scope API, SVG as Favicon
2.2	Futhark	Peregrine		9.7		
2.2.15	Futhark	Peregrine	10.0; 10.1	9.8		Acid3 test: 100/100, pixel-perfect, Web fonts, CSS Selectors API, RGBA & HSLA opacity, TLS 1.2., FPS in SVG, SVG fonts in HTML
2.3	Futhark	Peregrine			Opera Devices SDK 10	CSS3 : border-image, border-radius (rounded corners), box-shadow, transitions; HTML5: <audio> and <video> elements
2.4	Futhark	Peregrine		10		CSS2.1: visibility:collapse; CSS3 : transforms; HTML5: <canvas> shadows, Web Database, Web Storage, window.btoa, and window.atob
2.5.24	Carakan	Evenes	10.5	10.1	Opera Mini server	CSS3: multiple backgrounds; HTML5: <canvas> Text
2.6.30	Carakan	Evenes	10.6			WebM; HTML5: AppCache, Geolocation, Web Workers
2.7.62	Carakan	Kjevik	11.0	11.0		Extensions, WebSocket
2.8.131	Carakan	Barracuda	11.1	11.1	Opera Mini server 4.27	WebP, File API, CSS3 gradients (only for the background and background-image properties): -o-linear-gradient(), -o-repeating-linear-gradient(); Support for <color-stop> added.
2.9.168	Carakan	Swordfish	11.5			Session history management, classList (DOMTokenList)
2.9.201	Carakan			11.50 for Android		ECMAScript strict mode
2.10.229	Carakan	Tunny	11.6	11.6		HTML5 Parser, full support to CSS Gradients, Typed Arrays, CSS unit "rem"
2.10.254	Carakan	Wahoo		12.0		WebGL and hardware acceleration
2.10.289	Carakan	Wahoo	12.0			WebGL and hardware acceleration
2.11.355	Carakan	Marlin		12.1 for Android		SPDY, CSS3 Flexbox
2.12.388	Carakan	Marlin	12.10–12.18			SPDY, CSS3 Flexbox

== Presto-based applications ==
=== Web browsers ===
- Opera
  - Opera 7 to 12
  - Opera Mobile 9.5 to 12
  - Opera Mini (continues to use Presto rendering on an intermediate server on keypad phones and as Extreme mode on Android devices)
- Nintendo
  - Nintendo DS Browser (based on Opera)
  - Nintendo DSi Browser (based on Opera)
  - Wii Internet Channel Browser (based on Opera)
- Nokia 770 Browser (based on Opera)
- Sony Mylo COM-1's Browser (based on Opera)

=== HTML editors ===
- Macromedia Dreamweaver MX to Dreamweaver CS3 (CS4/CS5 use WebKit)
- Adobe Creative Suite 2 and 3

== Source code leak ==
The source code for version 12.15 was leaked to GitHub on February 11, 2016. It remained unnoticed until January 12, 2017 and was taken down two days later in response to a DMCA request. Opera Software has confirmed the authenticity of the source code.

== Cultural notes ==
The ECMAScript engines used with Opera have been named after ancient and traditional writing scripts, including undeciphered Linear A, Ancient Greek Linear B, Runic Futhark, and Javanese Carakan.

== See also ==
- Blink (browser engine)
- V8 (JavaScript engine)
