= Nintendo DS Browser =

Portable web browser software

- Cover of the DS Lite edition
- Developers: Opera Software; Nintendo
- Release: JP: July 24, 2006; EU: October 6, 2006; AU: January 18, 2007; NA: June 4, 2007
- Engine: Presto
- Platform: Nintendo DS
- Type: Mobile web browser
- Website: www.nintendo.com/consumer/systems/dslite/browser.jsp

The Nintendo DS Browser is a port of the Opera 8.5 web browser for use on the Nintendo DS, developed by Opera Software and Nintendo, and sold as a standalone game cartridge. Two versions were sold, one for the original Nintendo DS and one for the Nintendo DS Lite, each with a different Slot-2 memory expansion pack to fit the respective system.

The browser received mixed reviews from critics, largely focusing on its slow speeds despite its functionality. It was later rendered obsolete by an improved browser on the system's upgraded version, the Nintendo DSi, which, unlike its predecessor, was onboard software.

== Features ==
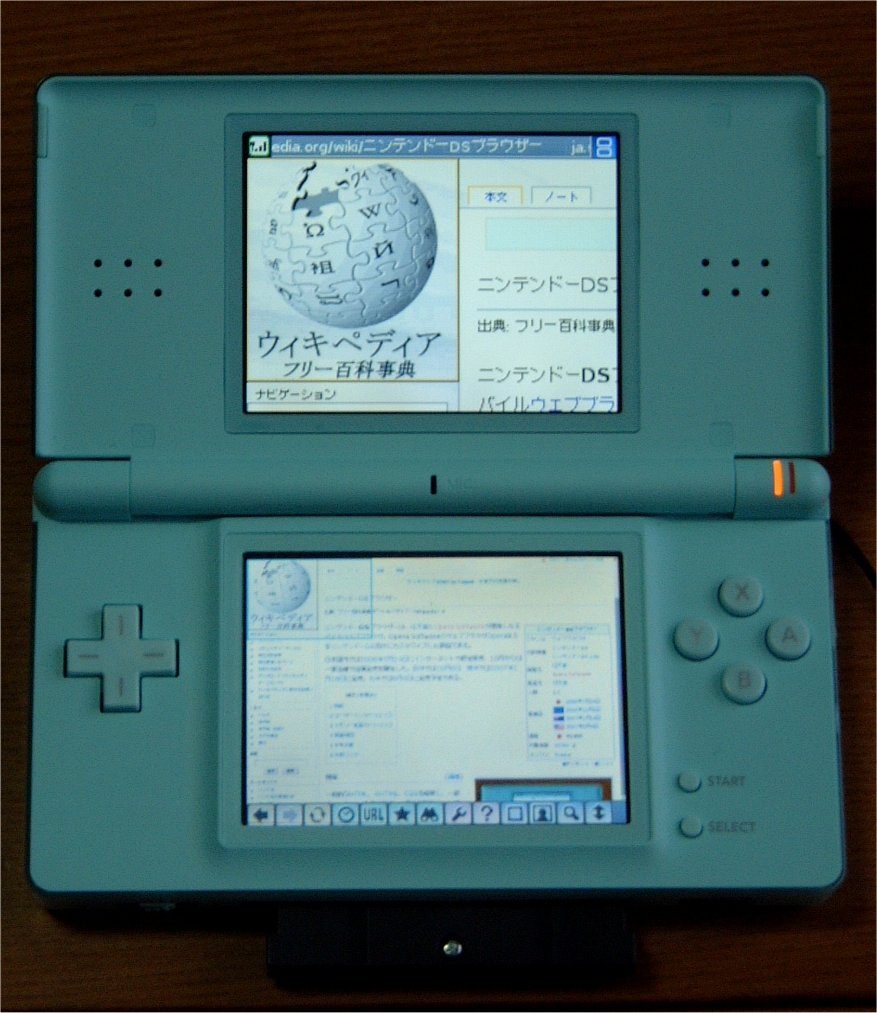
Japanese Wikipedia on Nintendo DS Browser

Nintendo DS Browser makes use of the Nintendo DS's touchscreen for input, with an on-screen keyboard as well as handwriting recognition and a stock of pre-set text (for example, the .com and .org top-level domains).

The browser can render pages in two modes, Small Screen Rendering (SSR) or Overview. In Small Screen Rendering mode, the contents of the page are displayed in a single column fitting the width of the screen - for example, a page featuring two columns of text side-by-side would be displayed as a single column, one after the other. In Overview mode, a scaled-down version of the page is displayed on the touchscreen with a small selection box which can be moved around using the stylus. The contents of the selection box are displayed on the top screen at their full size. This selection can be brought into the touchscreen to perform such actions as click on links or entering text in boxes.

The browser connects to the network through IEEE 802.11 Wi-Fi access points or hotspots using the built-in wireless capability of the Nintendo DS. While WEP encryption is supported, WPA encryption is not.

Nintendo has partnered with Internet security company Astaro to integrate web filtering technology into the Nintendo DS Browser. Called Astaro Parental Control, the technology acts as a proxy filter, providing the option of blocking inappropriate content. This is provided free of charge and can be activated through a simple menu option.

The Nintendo DS browser supports JavaScript and SSL in web pages, but does not support plugins like Adobe Flash and Java. Due to limited system resources, most other dynamic media, such as videos or sound, will not work in the browser.

=== Search ===
Both browsers include a web search feature. The Nintendo DS Browser defaults to Yahoo! (currently powered by Bing) outside of Japan, or Yahoo! Japan (currently powered by Google) in Japan, but can be configured to any supported search engine by editing the URL in the browser settings. The Nintendo DSi Browser limits search engine options to Google or Yahoo! Yahoo! Japan is no longer supported, as the browsers' security certificates have expired.

=== Standards compliance ===
Web standards support for Nintendo browsers
	DS	Wii	DSi	3DS	Wii U	New 3DS	Switch
Browser	Opera 8.5	Opera 9.3	Opera 9.5	NetFront NX			
Engine	Presto 1.0	Presto 2.0	Presto 2.1	WebKit			
Acid1	Success						
Acid2	Failure	Success	Partial	Failure		Partial	Success
Acid3	0%		61%	92%	100%		98%
HTML5Test	0	65	65	83	256	257	335

The Nintendo DSi Browser passes the Acid1 test. It nearly passes the Acid2 test, except for fixed element positioning, resulting in two stray squares. It receives a 59% on the Acid3 test in Overview Mode and a 53% in Column Mode, although the page does not display properly in the latter. The Acid3 score was updated to 61% in April 2014. In comparison, the Internet Browser used by newer Nintendo systems is powered by NetFront NX and uses the WebKit browser engine. The newer browser also passes the Acid1 test, and while it fails Acid2, it scores better on Acid3: 92% on the original Nintendo 3DS, and 100% on the Wii U and New Nintendo 3DS.

The browser has partial Unicode support, including nearly complete support of Western and CJK sets, and several universal symbols. The browser font is used for all text and supports the text shadow style, but not bold or italic. Emoji is not natively supported, but can be displayed by using an emoji library, such as Twemoji.

== Memory Expansion Pak ==
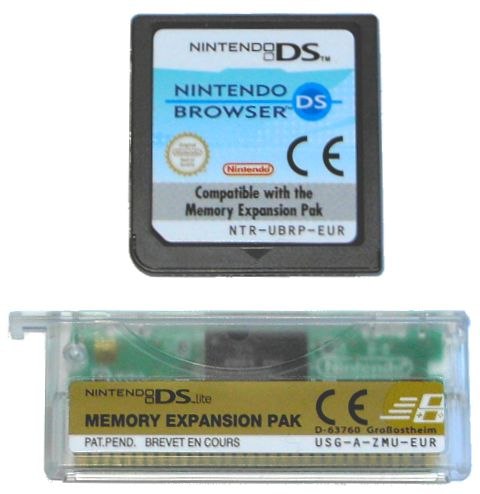
European DS Browser cartridge and DS Lite expansion pak

The Memory Expansion Pak, much like the Rumble Pak, is a DS Option Pak accessory for the Nintendo DS and DS Lite. It is inserted into Slot-2, and it adds 8 MB of RAM to the system for a total of 12 MB. The accessory is available in two versions: one for the original Nintendo DS, and one that exclusively works with the DS Lite. (The original version is also compatible with the DS Lite, although the cartridge protrudes from the console.) Retailers carried both versions in Japan and Europe, but other regions only sold the DS Lite version at retail, while Nintendo made the original version available by mail order.

The Nintendo DS Browser is the only licensed software for the console that used this accessory, although the browser's instruction manual suggested that other games and software could use the memory, whether mandatory or optional. Thus, the accessory behaves similarly to the Nintendo 64 Expansion Pak. Unofficial homebrew software, such as DSLinux and Moonshell, can utilize the accessory.

Third-party versions of the Memory Expansion Pak also exist: the EZ-V 3-in-1 offers 16 MB of RAM, while other manufacturers (Supercard, M3 and G6) offer 32 MB of RAM. The Nintendo DS Browser refuses to boot with these devices. On November 16, 2006, the ROM hacking community released a patch to enable third-party memory accessories with the browser, which must be installed as a ROM image on a homebrew device. It is unclear if the browser uses all of the additional RAM, or if it is limited to just 8 MB.

== Launch ==
On February 15, 2006, the Opera Software company announced plans to develop a web browser for the Nintendo DS.

In Australia and the United States, only the DS Lite version was released in stores; the DS Original version was only available as an online order from Nintendo.

== Reception ==
Reception

Review score
Publication	Score
IGN	3.5/10

Reviews for the Nintendo DS Browser were generally mixed. Craig Harris of IGN rated the software 3.5/10 points, noting shortcomings such as extended loading times and lack of Flash support for audio and videos, and suspecting it was due to the system's "underpowered" hardware. Will Greenwald of CNET rated it 4.7/10 points, saying that it failed to live up to its potential. Justin Towell of GamesRadar+ called the browser "sluggish but functional", remarking that it worked better on some sites than others.

== Legacy ==
In August 2007, the Nintendo DS Browser was discontinued in North America. The Nintendo DSi is incompatible with the browser and any Memory Expansion Pak, but it is a more powerful system, with faster processors and 16 MB of RAM. The Nintendo DSi Browser was free, and outperformed its predecessor. Both of Nintendo's next systems, the 3DS and Wii U included a web browser built in, although this feature was omitted from their following systems, the Nintendo Switch and Nintendo Switch 2.

== See also ==
- Nintendo 3DS Internet Browser
- Wii U Internet Browser
- Wii Internet Channel
