= Opera (company) =

Norwegian software company

Opera Norway AS
- Type: Public company
- Traded as: Nasdaq: OPRA
- Industry: Software; Internet
- Founded: 1995; 31 years ago in Oslo, Norway
- Founders: Jon Stephenson von Tetzchner; Geir Ivarsøy
- Headquarters: Oslo, Norway
- Key people: Lin Song (CEO); Zhou Yahui (executive chairman); Frode Jacobsen (CFO)
- Products: Opera; Opera GX
- Revenue: ▲US$615 million (2025)
- Net income: ▲US$108 million (2025)
- Total assets: ▲US$1.14 billion (2025)
- Total equity: ▲US$1.01 billion (2025)
- Owners: Kunlun Tech Co., Ltd. (Zhou Yahui)
- Number of employees: 605 (2025)
- Parent: Opera Software ASA (1995–2016); Kunlun Tech Co., Ltd. (2020–present)
- Website: www.opera.com

Opera Norway AS is a multinational technology corporation headquartered in Oslo, Norway, with additional offices in Europe, China, and Africa. Opera offers a range of products and services that include PC and mobile web browsers, GameMaker and gaming portals, the Opera News content recommendation products, the Opera Ads platform, and a number of Web3 and e-commerce products and services. Opera is noted for browser innovation and its early adoption of technologies such as artificial intelligence (AI), cryptocurrency, and Web3. The company has 296 million monthly active users.

On July 2018, Opera Limited became a public company for the second time after being acquired by Chinese Consortium in 2016, listed on the NASDAQ Stock Exchange, raising $115 million in its initial public offering.

Opera is owned & controlled by Chinese company Kunlun Tech Co., Ltd. which holds 69% shares since at least 2024, with shares above 50% controlled since 2021. Zhou Yahui, the controlling shareholder of Kunlun, is executive chairman of Opera's board.

== History ==
=== Early development ===
Opera was founded as an independent company in Norway in 1995 by the Icelandic Jon Stephenson von Tetzchner and Geir Ivarsøy, making it one of the oldest web browser companies still active. They had initially begun development of the Opera web browser while both working at Norwegian telecommunications company Telenor.

Opera's first product, the Opera web browser version 2.10 for Windows, was publicly released in 1996. Opera began development of its first browser for mobile device platforms in 1998. Opera 4.0, released in 2000, included a new cross-platform core that facilitated creation of editions of Opera for multiple operating systems and platforms.

Up to this point, the Opera browser was trialware and had to be purchased after the trial period ended, however, this ended with version 5.0, released in 2000. Instead, Opera became ad-sponsored, displaying advertisements to users without a license, which was commonly criticized as a barrier to gaining market share. In newer versions, the user was allowed a choice of generic graphical banners or text-based targeted advertisements provided by Google based upon the page being viewed.

=== First IPO and public company ===
In February 2004, Opera announced it was preparing for an initial public offering on the Oslo Stock Exchange in March. On 11 March, Opera's IPO opened, trading under the symbol OPERA.

In 2004, Opera settled a lawsuit with an "international corporation" paying US$12.75 million to Opera. It was speculated that the "international corporation" named in the statement announcing the settlement was Microsoft, which had previously blocked Opera users from correctly viewing MSN.com.

On 12 January 2005, Opera announced that it would offer free licenses to higher education institutions — a change from the previous cost of US$1,000 for unlimited licenses. Schools that opted for the free license included Massachusetts Institute of Technology (MIT), Harvard University, University of Oxford, Georgia Institute of Technology, and Duke University.

With version 8.5 (released in 2005) the advertisements were removed entirely and primary financial support came through revenue from Google (Opera's default search engine). In August 2005, the company introduced Opera Mini, a new Java ME based web browser for mobile phones originally marketed not to end users but to mobile network operators to pre-load on phones or offer for their subscribers. In 2007, Opera filed a complaint against Microsoft in the European Commission, alleging that bundling Internet Explorer with Microsoft Windows is harmful to both the consumer and to other web browser companies. The complaint resulted in the creation of BrowserChoice.eu.

In 2011, development directors Rolf Assev and Christen Krogh, decided to quit Opera to try something new.

In 2012, Opera and Bharti Airtel signed an agreement to provide Opera Mini browsers to Airtel mobile customers. In 2013 Opera decided to not use their in-house rendering engine for the Desktop Browser anymore. From Version 15, the Opera browser for computers would be using the Blink rendering engine, a fork of Webkit developed together with Google.

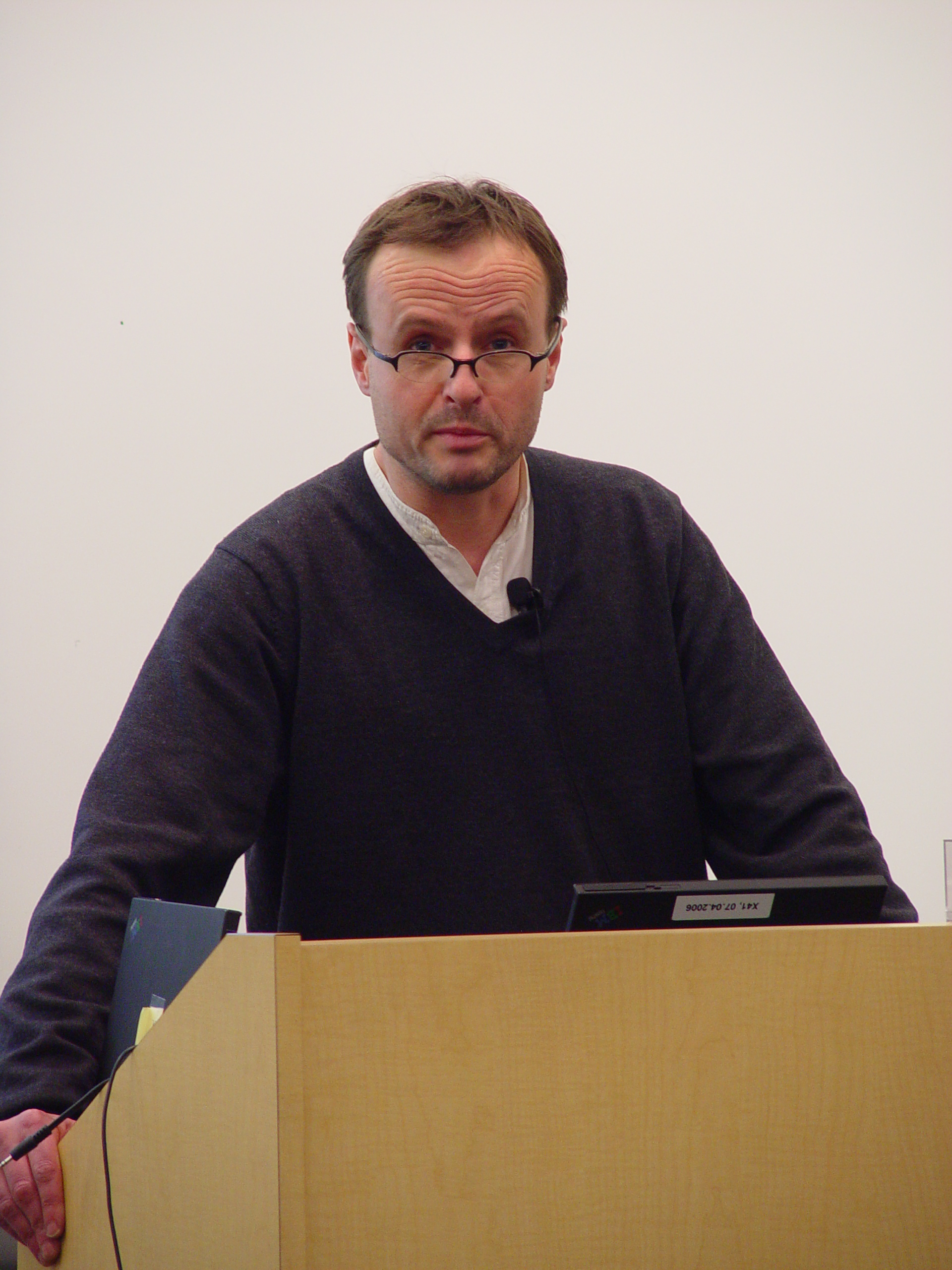
Håkon Wium Lie, former chief technical officer

In March 2015, Mobile World Congress in Barcelona, Opera won Global Mobile Award of Best Mobile Product, Initiative or Service in Emerging Markets for Opera Web Pass and Sponsored Web Pass. In April Opera decided to centre development of the Opera Desktop browser in Poland. On 12 April, Opera TV AS (now Vewd Software AS) was established to separate TV-related business from all other assets, which became part of Opera; both companies became wholly owned subsidiaries of Opera Software ASA (now Otello). In September, the company announced a rebrand with a new three-dimensional "O" logo and brand identity. In the process, the company logotype changed from "Opera Software" to "Opera".

=== Acquisition and second IPO ===
In 2016, the company changed ownership when a group of Chinese investors purchased the web browser, consumer business, and brand of Opera Software ASA. The remaining assets were renamed as the Otello Corporation. The ownership change was initiated in February 2016 when a group of Chinese investors offered US$1.2 billion ($8.31 per share) to buy Opera Software ASA, (Note: Opera Software ASA (now Otello Corporation ASA) and Opera Software AS are different companies.) though the deal reportedly did not meet regulatory approval. On 18 July 2016, Opera Software ASA announced it had sold its browser, privacy and performance apps, and the Opera brand to Golden Brick Capital Private Equity Fund I Limited Partnership (a consortium of Chinese investors led by Beijing Kunlun Tech Co and Qihoo 360) for an amount of US$600 million. The transaction for sale of Opera's consumer business was approved on 31 October 2016 by the Committee on Foreign Investment in the United States. An earlier deal was not approved by Norwegian regulators. On 4 November 2016, Golden Brick Capital Private Equity Fund I L.P. completed the acquisition. After divesting itself of the Opera browser and brand, Opera Software ASA changed its name to Otello Corporation ASA.

In January 2017, the company introduced Opera Neon, a new concept browser that is intended as an exploration of browser design alternatives. The browser is built on top of the Blink engine similar to the original Opera browser, and it is available for Windows and macOS. In January 2018, Opera launched Opera News, an AI-driven news app dedicated to African users. It reached more than a million downloads in less than a month. In April, the company released a new mobile browser called Opera Touch. It includes an innovative user interface focused on ease of use and one-handed browsing. In July 2018, Opera filed for an IPO. The company went public on the NASDAQ on 27 July and raised over $115 million. Opera is a subsidiary of Kunlun Tech Co., Ltd., and controlled by Zhou Yahui.

=== Acquisitions ===
In November 2019, Opera launched a new project called Opera News Hub. The platform helps bloggers create and share content. In January 2020, Opera acquired PocoSys, an Estonian startup that developed banking-as-a-service software. The deal also included an agreement to take over Pocopay, PocoSys's sister company. In June 2020, Opera partnered with APO Group to provide accurate information about COVID-19 in Africa. News articles from different health authorities are collected by APO and made available to Opera users through the Opera Mini browser and Opera News app.

Opera acquired YoYo Games from Playtech in January 2021, for US$10 million, from which the company also announced the launch of its Opera Gaming division to promote game development within the Opera GX browser with YoYo Games and its GameMaker game development software.

In February 2021, Opera launched the fintech Dify, an in-browser payment app that includes cashback service and a digital wallet. Customers who use Dify get reimbursed when purchasing items from partner websites like Nike, Asos, and eDreams. The fintech was first offered in beta in Spain.

== Products ==
=== Active products ===
- Opera desktop browser (Windows, macOS, Linux)
- Opera Air (Windows and macOS)
- Opera Mobile browser (iOS and Android)
- Opera GX: Opera's gaming browser, released in June 2019. The browser allows users to customize how much RAM, CPU, and network bandwidth it uses, and reached 34 million average monthly active users in 2024.
- Opera Neon: an AI-powered agentic web browser introduced in 2025 that can perform tasks on behalf of users and assist with content creation and web-based workflows.
- Opera Mini: originally released in 2005, version 50 of the browser was released in May 2020. The redesign included a new UI, an improved data-saving mode, and a built-in file sharing service.
- Opera News: released in 2018, a news app with an AI-engine In 2025, Opera announced that its Opera News service had more than 368 million monthly active users in 2024.
- Opera Ads: advertising platform which integrates into all of Opera's products released in May 2019.
- GameMaker: a 2D gaming development platform

=== Minority investments ===
- OPay: a privately held mobile payment fintech company, incubated by Opera, focused on emerging markets, with Nigeria and Egypt as initial key markets. As of 31 December 2024, Opera owned 9.4% of OPay.

=== Discontinued products ===
In August 2017, Opera Coast was quietly discontinued and removed from the Apple App Store. No official reasoning was provided.

In February 2018, after previously announcing that the service and app would be shut down, the Opera Max app, a VPN based mobile data compression service, was sold to Samsung. It was rebranded as Samsung Max, but will only be compatible with eligible Samsung Galaxy smartphones going forward.

Since then, Opera has developed its own VPN available within its desktop and Android browser.

In August 2020, Opera announced its divestment from majority ownership of its microlending business, including the products OKash and Opesa, before selling its stake outright in March 2022.

On 22 March 2021, in celebration of the three-year-anniversary of Opera Touch, it was announced that the iOS version of Opera Touch was rebranded to simply Opera and was given a new redesigned UI.

== Controversies ==
Opera was involved in a years-long feud with Microsoft dating back to 2001. On at least three occasions, Opera accused Microsoft of deliberately breaking interoperability of its MSN services and the Opera browser or other non-Internet Explorer browsers. Microsoft denied that it was intentionally shutting out Opera users. In response, Opera released the "Bork Edition" of its web browser, causing MSN to display only the phrase, "Bork, bork, bork!" which was popularized by The Muppet Show character, Swedish Chef. In 2004, Opera received a confidential $12.75 million payment from an "international corporation" reported to be Microsoft.

In 2013, Opera switched from its rendering engine, Presto, to Chromium's WebKit (now Blink), a decision described as a "sad day for the web."

From 2018 to 2020, Opera was involved in the incubation of Kenyan loan companies OKash and Opesa. In January 2020, the then Opera-owned businesses were accused of offering predatory terms with interest rates of up to 876 percent per annum and employing unethical debt recovery practices such as debt shaming and abusing customer privacy. In August 2020, Opera announced its divestment from majority ownership of its microlending holdings, and in March 2022, Opera sold its stake outright.
