= Opay =

Nigerian mobile banking company

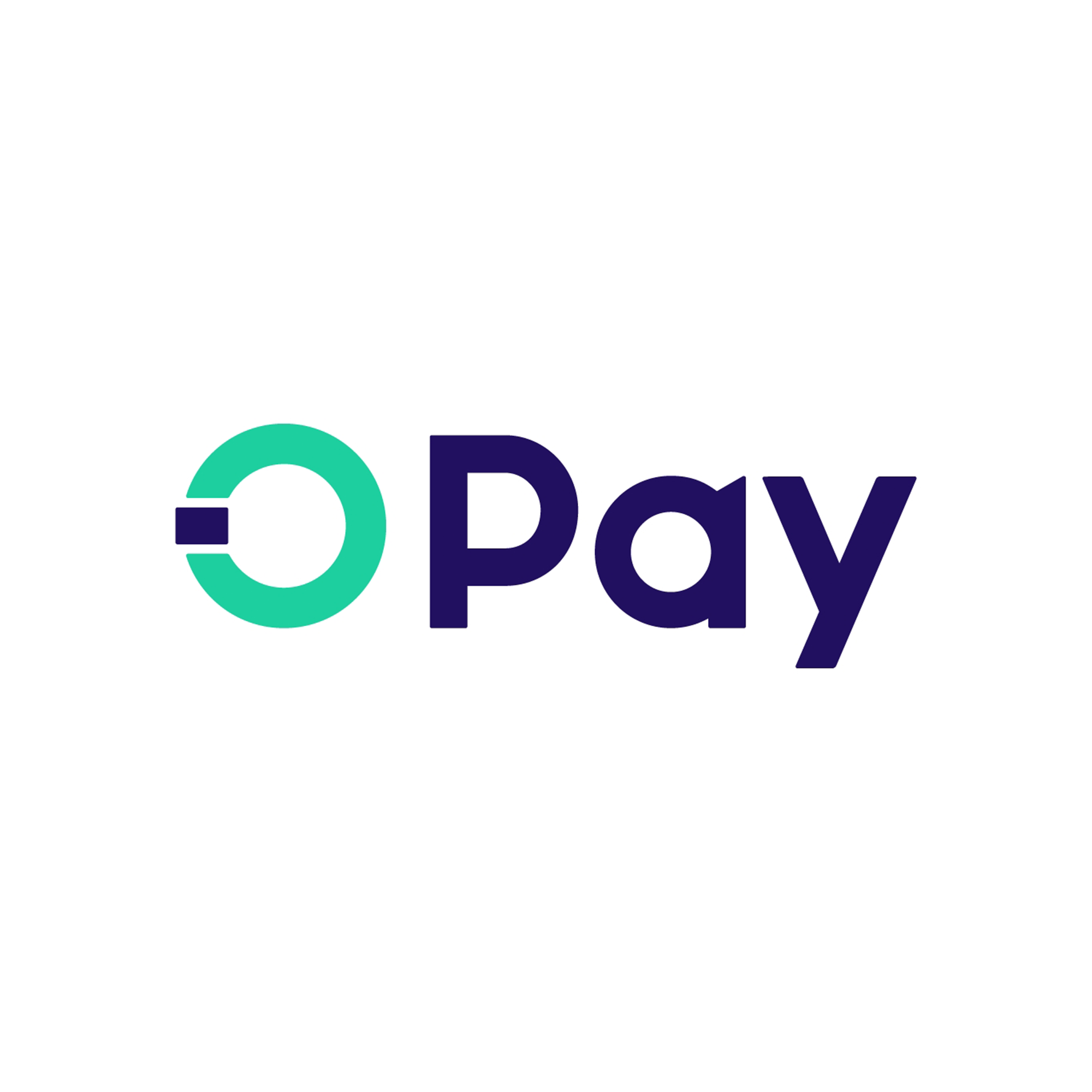
- Native name: Opay Digital Services Limited
- Industry: Banking, mobile banking
- Founded: January 1, 2018; 8 years ago
- Headquarters: Singapore, Nigeria
- Website: www.opayweb.com

OPay is a fintech company focused on emerging markets. Since its establishment in 2018, OPay is providing convenient digital wallet and payment services to the unbanked population in Africa. Currently, its business has expanded to Nigeria, Egypt, Pakistan, Indonesia, and other countries, providing inclusive and convenient financial services such as loans, payments, digital wallets, and innovative solutions powered by AI and big data.

== History ==
OPay was established in 2018, and licensed by the Central Bank of Nigeria (CBN) in 2018.It was insured by the Nigeria Deposit Insurance Corporation(NDIC). In May 2019, OPay launched its Point of sale service, which was mostly dominant in Nigeria during the naira cash strike. In November 2021 Olu Akanmu was appointed the co-CEO of OPay until his resignation in 2023. On December 1, 2025，has announced key management appointments，the newly formed management team includes Lars Boilesen as Co-CEO, Stephen as Co-CEO and COO, and James Perry as CFO.

In September 2021, OPay received an international funding led by SoftBank Vision Fund. OPay extended to Egypt in 2021, and was approved by the Central Bank of Egypt as well as to issue prepaid cards. In May 2022, OPay Nigeria partnered with the Verve International to enrol its verve debit card.

OPay customers rallied at the company's headquarters in Lagos, over a leaked scam alert from an agent. The company however refuted this claim. In 2023 Sharia court in Kano State sentenced an OPay's agent to nine months imprisonment over breach of trust and stealing from an online customer.

OPay was one of the Four Fintechs asked to stop onboarding of customers by the CBN in April 2024. This was due to an increased scrutiny of these banks on their KYC processes. The restriction, however, was lifted in June of the same year 2024

== Withdrawn IPO ==
In October 2026, OPay pursued an initial public offering (IPO) on the New York Stock Exchange (NYSE), pricing 16 million American depositary shares (ADSs) at US$19 each. The offering was expected to raise US$304 million at an implied company valuation of approximately US$4 billion.

On 30 October 2026, OPay withdrew the proposed offering following a regulatory inquiry in an undisclosed foreign jurisdiction. The company and its underwriters mutually terminated their underwriting agreement, and the planned NYSE listing did not proceed. OPay stated that the inquiry would not affect its operations or service delivery in Nigeria and other markets. On November 4, 2026, Bloomberg reported that OPay's withdrawn IPO was preceded by inquiries it received from the China Securities Regulatory Commission.

== See also ==
- Economy of Nigeria
- List of banks in Nigeria
