= Opera Mobile =

Freeware web browser for mobile devices

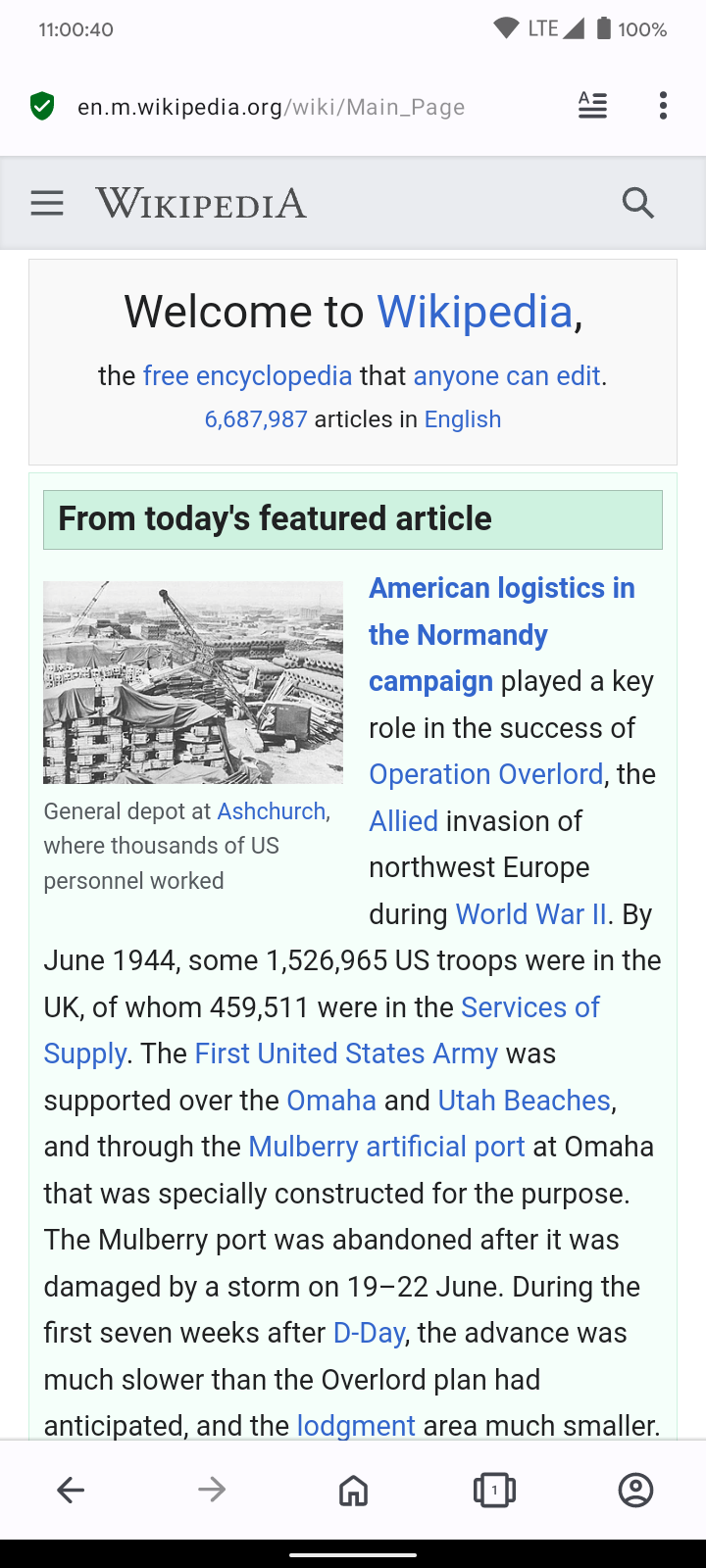
- Opera Browser 74 for Android
- Developer: Opera
- Stable release: 76.2.4027.73374 / 28 June 2023
- Preview release: 76.0.4027.73226 / 20 June 2023
- Engine: Presto until 12.16; WebKit for 14; Blink from 15.0
- Platform: Android; Maemo; MeeGo; S60; Windows Mobile; Windows
- Type: Mobile browser
- License: Freeware
- Website: www.opera.com/mobile

Opera Mobile is a mobile web browser for smartphones, tablets and PDAs developed by Opera.

== History ==
The first devices to run a mobile edition of Opera were the Psion Series 5, Psion Series 5mx, Psion Series 7, and then Psion netBook. They ran Opera Mobile 3.6, released in 2000.

Opera Mobile was ported to the Windows Mobile operating system in 2003.

- Version 6.0 was the initial release.
- On June 25, 2003, the first update came in the form of version 6.01, which was a minor update, mainly correcting bugs.
- Version 6.10, released on October 27, 2003, introduced several user interface and usability improvements, considerably optimized performance, and slightly improved page rendering. It was also the first version to support proxy servers, WAP pages, and the first one to be released in localized versions for 9 different languages.
- On July 13, 2005, almost two years after the previous iteration, version 8.0 was launched. This version was the first to require Symbian OS 7 (previous ones could function in Symbian 6.1). This version introduced the Opera Mobile Accelerator, a technology that uses an Opera-run external server to slim down the pages' content to reduce the traffic to the phones. This was also the first version to support dynamic HTML, and greatly improved compatibility with several web standards.
- On November 14, 2005, version 8.5 was introduced. This version introduced password management and form auto-filling functionality, added some more languages for localized versions, and made some improvements to stability and reduced-screen rendering quality.
- On April 5, 2006, version 8.6 was released and was also the first version to support Symbian OS 9. New to this version is the ability to support multiple browsing windows, support for Scalable Vector Graphics, introduction of URL autocompletion as well as several changes in the customization aspect. It was also the first version of Opera Mobile that allowed for the possibility to configure it as the device's default browser, allowing it to be launched whenever a web page was requested to be opened.
- Version 8.65 was released on August 29, 2006, which was mostly a welcome makeover and optimization to the then-considered mature 8.60.
- Opera Mobile 9.0 was announced in February 2007 with a planned feature list, "coming soon" banners on the official Opera Mobile website, and official announcements in Opera's Community Forum. With no reason given, version 9.0 was cancelled, all references to it were swept from Opera's site and 8.65 went back to being the latest version, being given a very slight refresh in the form of a new build that offered a handful of hardly-noticeable features, some of them platform-dependent.
- On February 5, 2008, Opera Mobile 9.5 was announced. The date for its expected release was pushed back several times. A beta test version for Windows Mobile was released on July 17, 2008, followed by a second beta release on October 20, 2008, including support for Opera Widgets, and adding Symbian UIQ3 as a further platform. (The last released version of Opera Mobile for Symbian S60 remains 8.65.)
- On March 26, 2009, Opera announced that the next release version would be 9.7, with changes in the Presto layout engine, not 9.5. On June 8, 2009, Opera Mobile 9.7 beta was made available, with the new Presto 2.2 rendering engine and Opera Turbo. Other features planned for the 9.7 release were an improved Widget manager, Google Gears, and OpenGL ES support.
- On November 2, 2009, Opera Mobile 10 beta for Symbian S60 was made available for download, with a revised user interface and performance enhancements. On December 10, 2009, it was released to operators and OEMs. It included Opera's new, cross-platform UI framework that unifies the look and feel of the browser across all platforms running Opera Mobile or Opera Mini. On February 12, 2010, Opera Mobile 10 beta 3 was publicly released for Windows Mobile and Symbian devices, with support for Flash Lite 3.1, better recognition for third-party input solutions in Windows Mobile, and support for Windows Mobile Standard (non-touchscreen) handsets. On March 16, 2010, Opera Software released the final versions of Opera Mobile 10.

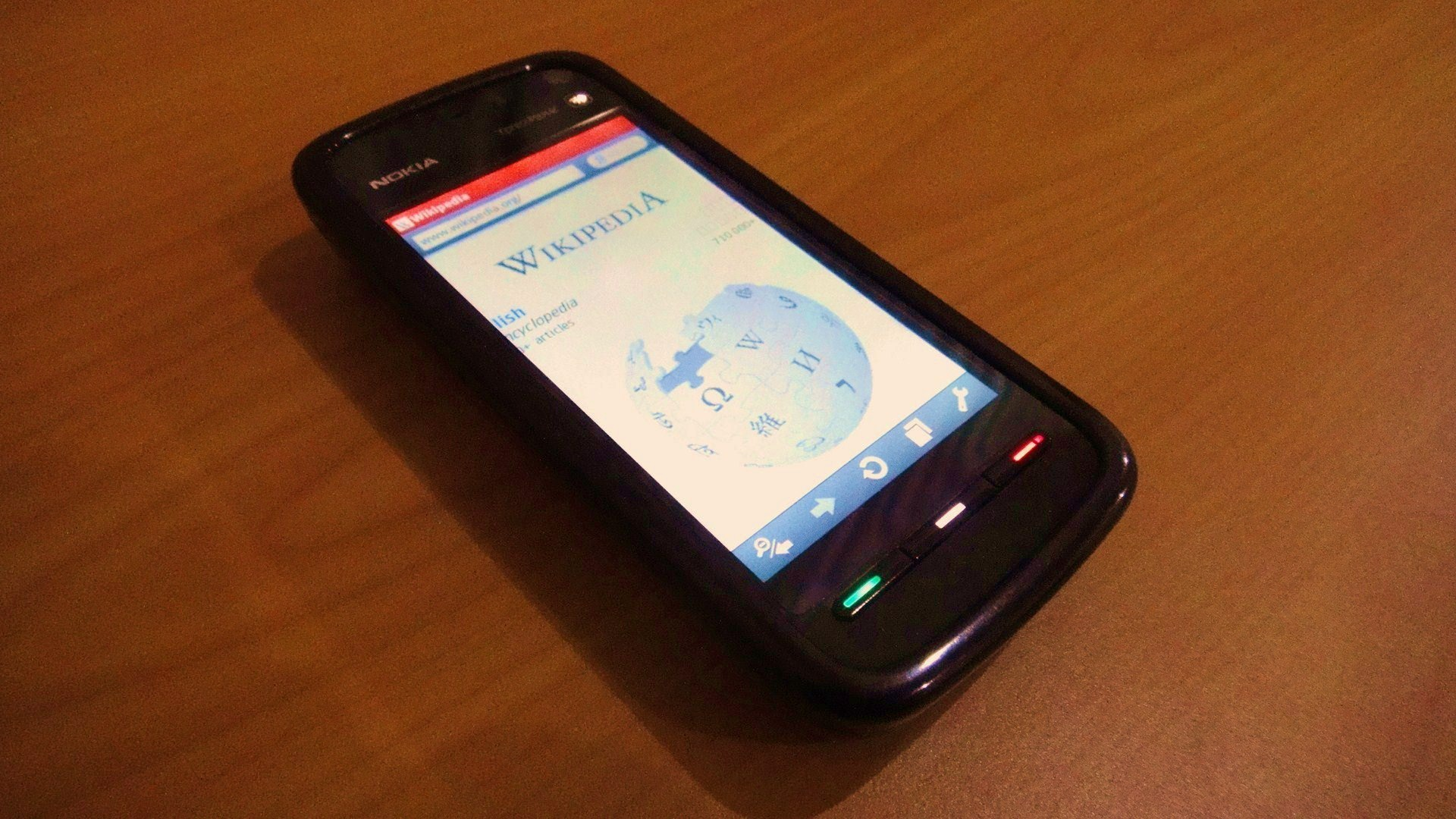
The Nokia 5800 XpressMusic, running Opera Mobile 10.1 Beta

- On May 11, 2010, Opera labs released a preview build of Opera Mobile 10 for Maemo, with the same features available in Opera Mobile 10 for other platforms, but using Opera's new Carakan JavaScript engine (codenamed) and the new Vega vector graphics library. Opera Mobile 10 was the last version for Windows Mobile (as distinct from its successor Windows Phone).
- On October 15, 2010, Opera Software released the first Android build, Opera Mobile 10.1 Beta for Android.
- On March 22, 2011, Opera Software released Opera Mobile 11 for Android and Symbian S60; Maemo, MeeGo, and Windows.
- On February 27, 2012, Opera Software released Opera Mobile 12 for Android, Symbian/S60, Maemo (labs), and MeeGo (labs) smartphones.
- In July 2013, Opera Software released Opera Mobile 15 for Android, based on Chromium. The interface was heavily redesigned. Some features such as bookmarks were removed, and others such as a Discover function on the Home Page were added.
- In September 2013, Opera Software released Opera Mobile 16 for Android, with an updated Chromium engine and some performance improvements.

== Features ==
Opera Mobile used the Presto layout engine until version 15, which was replaced by WebKit, then Blink and supports many web standards, as well as Ajax. As of version 9.7, it can use Opera Turbo that compresses web pages via Opera Software's "Turbo" servers, thus reducing download size. Because web pages are compressed, page loading times are improved, and bandwidth consumption is reduced by up to 80%.

The browser can dynamically reformat web pages for a small screen, using Opera's Small Screen Rendering (SSR) technology and text-wrapping.

Opera Mobile 10 includes a "Speed Dial" feature, which allows the user to add links shown as thumbnail images in a page displayed when a new tab is opened. Once set up, this feature allows the user to more easily navigate to the selected web pages, and visual tabs, that allow the browsing of multiple websites at one time. It also includes a password manager and pop-up handler, and it supports copy and paste, address auto-complete, zooming, history, and bookmarks (removed in Opera Mobile 15).

The browser can be used by either using finger-touch, a stylus on a touchscreen or with a keypad and can be displayed in portrait and landscape mode.

== Other versions ==
=== Opera Mini ===
Opera Mini is a mobile web browser for Java ME, Symbian OS, Android et Windows Phone, targeted at low-end devices and lower bandwidth connections. Initially released in 2005, it was derived from the Opera web browser. In March 2012, Opera Mini had 168.8 million active users. In February 2013, Opera reported 300 million unique active Opera Mini users and 150 billion page views served during that month. This represented an increase of 25 million users from September 2012.

=== Opera Touch ===
Opera Touch is a discontinued web browser exclusively for Android since 2021. Initially released in 2018, it was created primarily for single-handed use. In March 2021, in celebration of the three-year anniversary of the browser, the iOS version was rebranded to simply Opera. It was also given a new, refurbished UI.

=== Opera Coast ===
Opera Coast is a discontinued web browser developed for the iPad on September 9, 2013, and the iPhone version followed on April 24, 2014. It was created primarily for touch while traditional browser buttons such as tabs, bookmarks, etc., are replaced by gestures. Coast was discontinued and removed from the App Store in August 2017 for an unknown reason.

=== Release compatibility ===
Operating system		Latest version	Year	Support Date	Engine
Android (including Android for ARMv6)	7.0 and later	76.2.4027.73374 (ARMv7, x86)	2023	2016–	Blink
Android (including Android for ARMv6)	6.x	72.5.3767.69342 (ARMv7, x86)	2022	2015–2023	Blink
Android (including Android for ARMv6)	5.x	62.3.3146.57763 (ARMv7)	2021	2014–2021	Blink
Android (including Android for ARMv6)	5.x	62.3.3146.57763 (x86)	2021	2014–2021	Blink
Android (including Android for ARMv6)	4.4	58.4.2878.56737 (ARMv7)	2020	2013–2020	Blink
Android (including Android for ARMv6)	4.4	58.4.2878.56737 (x86)	2020	2013–2020	Blink
Android (including Android for ARMv6)	1.6–4.4	12.1.9 (ARMv5, ARMv6 and ARMv7)	2015	2010–2015	Presto
Symbian	S60v3 and later	12.0.2	2012	2006–2012	Presto
Symbian	S60v2	8.65	2006	2003–2010	Presto
Symbian	S60v1	6.20	2004	2003–2005	Elektra
EPOC	R3 to R5	5.14	2002	2000–2002	Elektra
Windows Mobile	5–6.5.3	10.0	2010	2006–2010	Presto
Windows Mobile	2003	8.65	2007	2006–2010	Presto

== Awards ==
- Tietokone magazine "Best Software Product of the Year" 2003
- Mobile Gala "Best program for handheld computers" 2004
- Mobile Gala "Best program for mobile phones" 2004
- Smartphone and PocketPC Magazine "Best mobile browser for both Windows-based Pocket PC and Smartphones" 2007
