= Ashkan Soltani =

American computer scientist

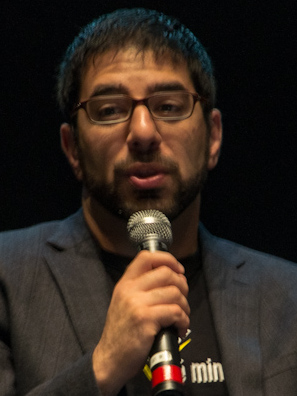
- Education: University of California, San Diego (B.A.); University of California, Berkeley (M.A.)
- Occupations: Chief Technologist, Federal Trade Commission; Privacy and security researcher
- Website: ashkansoltani.org

Ashkan Soltani is a privacy and security researcher. He was formerly the executive director of the California Privacy Protection Agency. He has previously been the Chief Technologist of the Federal Trade Commission and an independent privacy and security researcher based in Washington, DC.

== Education ==
Soltani attended the University of California, San Diego, where he received a bachelor's degree in cognitive science. Soltani would later receive a master's degree from the University of California, Berkeley School of Information.

== Career in government ==
Between 2010 and 2011, Soltani worked for the US Federal Trade Commission as a staff technologist in the Division of Privacy and Identity Protection, where he assisted with the investigations of Google and Facebook. Soltani previously worked as the primary technical consultant to The Wall Street Journal's "What They Know" series investigating online privacy.

In 2011, he testified at two different hearings held by US Senate committees focused on privacy related matters. Julia Angwin, in her 2014 book Dragnet Nation, describes Soltani as 'the leading technical expert on ad tracking technology'. He was part of the team at The Washington Post that shared the 2014 Pulitzer Prize for Public Service with The Guardian US and earned the 2014 Gerald Loeb Award for Large Newspapers for their coverage of the disclosures about surveillance done by the US National Security Agency.

In 2021, Soltani became the executive director of the California Privacy Protection Agency but departed in January 2025.

== Subjects of research ==
=== Flash cookie research ===
Soltani's first high-profile research project was a 2009 study, supported by the National Science Foundation's Team for Research in Ubiquitous Secure Computing, documenting the use of zombie Flash cookies by several online advertising networks. Soltani and his colleagues at Berkeley revealed that websites were recreating tracking cookies after consumers deleted them by storing the unique tracking identifiers in Flash cookies, which were not automatically deleted when consumers cleared their browser cookies.

After the publication of Soltani's research, class action law firms filed suit against several advertising networks and websites. Quantcast, Clearspring and VideoEgg collectively agreed to pay a total of $3.4 million to settle the lawsuits.

=== ETag tracking research ===
In 2011, Soltani and Berkeley law professor Chris Hoofnagle published a follow-up study, documenting the use of web browser cache ETags to store persistent identifiers. As with the case of Flash cookies, the identifiers stored in the ETags persisted even after consumers deleted their browser cookies. The ETag tracking issue caught the attention of several members of Congress, who wrote to the Federal Trade Commission in September 2011 and urged the agency to investigate the use of advanced tracking technologies as a potentially unfair or deceptive business practice.

Several companies performing ETag based tracking that were identified by the research team were subsequently sued by class action lawyers. In January 2013, KISSmetrics, an online advertising network, settled its ETag related lawsuit for $500,000.
