= Zombie cookie =

Cookie that is recreated after deletion

A zombie cookie is a piece of data usually used for tracking users, which is created by a web server while a user is browsing a website, and placed on the user's computer or other device by the user's web browser, similar to regular HTTP cookies, but with mechanisms in place to prevent the deletion of the data by the user. Zombie cookies could be stored in multiple locations—since failure to remove all copies of the zombie cookie will make the removal reversible, zombie cookies can be difficult to remove. Since they do not entirely rely on normal cookie protocols, the visitor's web browser may continue to recreate deleted cookies even though the user has opted not to receive cookies.

== Purpose ==
Web analytics collecting companies use cookies to track Internet usage and pages visited for marketing research. Sites that want to collect user statistics will install a cookie from a traffic tracking site that will collect data on the user. As that user surfs around the web the cookie will add more information for each site that uses the traffic tracking cookie and sends it back to the main tracking server.

Zombie cookies allow the web traffic tracking companies to retrieve information such as previous unique user ID and continue tracking personal browsing habits. When the user ID is stored outside of a single browser's cookie storage, such as in a header injected by the network into HTTP requests, zombie cookies can track users across browsers on the same machine.

Zombie cookies are also used to remember unique IDs used for logging into websites. This means that for a user who deletes all their cookies regularly, a site using this would still be able to personalize to that specific user.

== Implications ==
A user who does not want to be tracked may choose to decline or block third party cookies or delete cookies after each browsing session. Deleting all cookies will prevent some sites from tracking a user but it may also interfere with sites that users want to remember them. Removing tracking cookies is not the same as declining cookies. If cookies are deleted, the data collected by tracking companies becomes fragmented. For example, counting the same person as two separate unique users would falsely increase this particular site's unique user statistic. This is why some tracking companies use a type of zombie cookie.

== Implementation ==
According to TRUSTe: "You can get valuable marketing insight by tracking individual users' movements on your site. But you must disclose your use of all personally identifiable information in order to comply with the Fair Information Practices guidelines".

Possible places in which zombie cookies may be hidden include:

- Standard HTTP cookies
- Storing cookies in and reading out web history
- Storing cookies in HTTP ETags
- Internet Explorer userData storage (starting IE9, userData is no longer supported)
- HTML5 Session Storage
- HTML5 Local Storage
- HTML5 Global Storage
- HTML5 Database Storage via SQLite
- Storing cookies in RGB values of auto-generated, force-cached PNGs using HTML5 Canvas tag to read pixels (cookies) back out
- Local shared objects (Flash cookies)
- Silverlight Isolated Storage
- Cookie syncing scripts that function as a cache cookie and respawn the MUID cookie
- TCP Fast Open
- TLS's Session ID

If a user is not able to remove the cookie from every one of these data stores then the cookie will be recreated to all of these stores on the next visit to the site that uses that particular cookie. Every company has their own implementation of zombie cookies and those are kept proprietary. An open-source implementation of zombie cookies, called Evercookie, is available.

== Controversies ==
In 2015, TURN, an online advertising clearinghouse, introduced zombie cookies based on Flash Local Shared objects. Privacy advocates quickly denounced the technology.

An academic study of zombie cookies was completed in 2009, by a team of researchers at UC Berkeley, where they noticed that cookies which had been deleted, kept coming back, over and over again. They cited this as a serious privacy breach. Since most users are barely aware of the storage methods used, it's unlikely that users will ever delete them all. From the Berkeley report: "few websites disclose their use of Flash in privacy policies, and many companies using Flash are privacy certified by TRUSTe."

Ringleader Digital made an effort to keep a persistent user ID even when the user deleted cookies and their HTML5 databases. The only way to opt-out of the tracking, was to use the company's opt-out link, which gives no confirmation. This resulted in a lawsuit against Ringleader Digital.

The Zombie Cookie lawsuits were filed suit in the United States District Court for the Central District of California against Quantcast, Clearspring, VideoEgg, and affiliated sites owned by Walt Disney Internet Group, Warner Bros. and others. According to the charges, Adobe Flash cookies are planted to "track Plaintiffs and Class Members that visited non-Clearspring Flash Cookie Affiliates websites by having their online transmissions intercepted, without notice or consent".

Two "supercookie" mechanisms were found on Microsoft websites in 2011, including cookie syncing that respawned MUID cookies. Due to media attention, Microsoft later disabled this code.

Consumer outrage related to Flash cookies and violation of consumers' privacy caused U.S. Congressional Hearings, led by Senators Al Franken and John Rockefeller. Reportedly, the "Zombie Cookie", aka Flash Cookie filings, forced Adobe Systems Inc. to stop processing flash cookies on 98% of all consumers' computing devices.

The online advertising clearinghouse TURN implemented zombie cookies on Verizon mobile phones, using a hidden, unremovable number by which Verizon could track customers. After an article by ProPublica revealed this fact in January 2015, TURN claimed it had suspended usage of their zombie cookies.
