= Canvas fingerprinting =

Browser fingerprinting technique

Canvas fingerprinting is one of a number of browser fingerprinting techniques for tracking online users that allow websites to identify and track visitors using the HTML5 canvas element instead of browser cookies or other similar means. The technique received wide media coverage in 2014 after researchers from Princeton University and KU Leuven University described it in their paper The Web never forgets.

== Description ==
Canvas fingerprinting works by exploiting the HTML5 canvas element. As described by Acar et al.:

When a user visits a page, the fingerprinting script first draws text with the font and size of its choice and adds background colors (1). Next, the script calls Canvas API’s ToDataURL method to get the canvas pixel data in dataURL format (2), which is basically a Base64 encoded representation of the binary pixel data. Finally, the script takes the hash of the text-encoded pixel data (3), which serves as the fingerprint ...

Which graphics processing unit (GPU) or graphics driver is installed causes the fingerprint variation. The fingerprint can be stored and shared with advertising partners to identify users when they visit affiliated websites. A profile can be created from the user's browsing activity, allowing advertisers to target advertise to the user's inferred demographics and preferences.

By January 2022, the concept was extended to fingerprinting performance characteristics of the graphics hardware, called DrawnApart by the researchers.

=== Uniqueness ===
Since the fingerprint is primarily based on the browser, operating system, and installed graphics hardware, it does not, on its own, uniquely identify users. In a small-scale study with 294 participants from Amazon's Mechanical Turk, an experimental entropy of 5.7 bits was observed. The authors of the study suggest more entropy could likely be observed in the wild and with more patterns used in the fingerprint. While not sufficient to identify individual users by itself, this fingerprint could be combined with other entropy sources to provide a unique identifier. It is claimed that because the technique is effectively fingerprinting the GPU, the entropy is "orthogonal" to the entropy of previous browser fingerprint techniques such as screen resolution and browser JavaScript capabilities.

Much more unique identification becomes possible with DrawnApart, published in 2022, which was shown to boost tracking duration of individual fingerprints by 67% when used to enhance other methods.

== History ==
In May 2012, Keaton Mowery and Hovav Shacham, researchers at University of California, San Diego, wrote a paper Pixel Perfect: Fingerprinting Canvas in HTML5 describing how the HTML5 canvas could be used to create digital fingerprints of web users.

Social bookmarking technology company AddThis began experimenting with canvas fingerprinting early in 2014 as a potential replacement for cookies. 5% of the top 100,000 websites used canvas fingerprinting while it was deployed. According to AddThis CEO Richard Harris, the company has only used data collected from these tests to conduct internal research. Users will be able to install an opt-out cookie on any computer to prevent being tracked by AddThis with canvas fingerprinting.

A software developer writing in Forbes stated that device fingerprinting has been utilized for the purpose of preventing unauthorized access to systems long before it was used for tracking users without their consent.

As of 2014 the technique is widespread in many websites, used by at least a dozen high-profile web ads and user tracking suppliers.

In 2022, the capabilities of canvas fingerprinting were much deepened by taking minute differences between nominally identical units of the same GPU model into account. Those differences are rooted in the manufacturing process, making units more deterministic over time than between identical copies.

== Mitigation ==
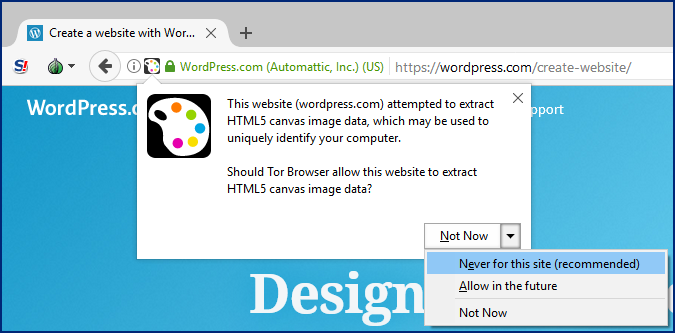
Typical Tor Browser notification of a website attempting a canvas read.

Tor Project reference documentation from 2018 states, "After plugins and plugin-provided information, we believe that the HTML5 Canvas is the single largest fingerprinting threat browsers face today." Tor Browser notifies the user of canvas read attempts and provides the option to return blank image data to prevent fingerprinting. However, Tor Browser is currently unable to distinguish between legitimate uses of the canvas element and fingerprinting efforts, so its warning cannot be taken as proof of a website's intent to identify and track its visitors.

Browser add-ons like Privacy Badger, DoNotTrackMe, or Adblock Plus manually enhanced with EasyPrivacy list are able to block third-party ad network trackers and can be configured to block fingerprinting scripts that use canvas fingerprinting, provided that the tracker is served by a third party server (as opposed to being implemented by the visited website itself).

== See also ==
- Evercookie – a type of browser cookie that is intentionally difficult to delete
- Local shared object – a persistent browser cookie also known as a Flash cookie
- Web storage – web application software methods and protocols used for storing data in a web browser
