= Cross-site =

Cross-site may refer to the following network security exploits:

- Cross-site cooking
- Cross-site request forgery
- Cross-site scripting
- Cross-site tracing
