= Cross-site cooking =

In cross-site cooking, the attacker exploits a browser bug to send an invalid cookie to a server.

Cross-site cooking is a type of browser exploit which allows a site attacker to set a cookie for a browser into the cookie domain of another site server.

Cross-site cooking can be used to perform session fixation attacks, as a malicious site can fixate the session identifier cookie of another site.

Other attack scenarios may also be possible, for example: attacker may know of a security vulnerability in server, which is exploitable using a cookie. But if this security vulnerability requires e.g. an administrator password which attacker does not know, cross-site cooking could be used to fool innocent users to unintentionally perform the attack.

Cross site. Cross-site cooking is similar in concept to cross-site scripting, cross-site request forgery, cross-site tracing, cross-zone scripting etc., in that it involves the ability to move data or code between different web sites (or in some cases, between e-mail / instant messages and sites). These problems are linked to the fact that a web browser is a shared platform for different information / applications / sites. Only logical security boundaries maintained by browsers ensures that one site cannot corrupt or steal data from another. However a browser exploit such as cross-site cooking can be used to move things across the logical security boundaries.

== Origins ==
The name cross-site cooking and concept was presented by Michał Zalewski in 2006. The name is a mix of "cookie" and "cross-site", attempting to describe the nature of cookies being set across sites.

In Michał Zalewski's article of 2006, Benjamin Franz was credited for his discovery, who in May 1998 reported a cookie domain related vulnerability to vendors. Benjamin Franz published the vulnerability and discussed it mainly as a way to circumvent "privacy protection" mechanisms in popular browsers. Michał Zalewski concluded that the bug, 8 years later, was still present (unresolved) in some browsers and could be exploited for cross-site cooking. Various remarks such as "vendors [...] certainly are not in a hurry to fix this" were made by Zalewski and others.
