= XST =

XST may refer to:

- Cross-site tracing, a network security vulnerability exploiting the HTTP TRACE method.
- Experimental Survivable Testbed, early versions of F-117 Nighthawk stealth aircraft.
- Exchequer Secretary to the Treasury, a junior minister in His Majesty's Treasury
