= NotScripts =

- Developer: Eric Wong
- Stable release: 0.9.6 / September 6, 2010
- Operating system: Microsoft Windows, Linux, and macOS
- Type: Google Chrome Extensions
- License: GPLv3+
- Website: code.google.com/p/notscripts/ optimalcycling.com/other-projects/notscripts at the Wayback Machine (archived May 24, 2014)

NotScripts was a free and open-source extension for Google Chrome, Chromium, and Opera web browsers. NotScripts blocked execution of JavaScript, Java, Flash, Silverlight, and other plugins and scripted content. NotScripts used a whitelist to allow execution of scripts from certain sites.

NotScripts has been abandoned by the developer. It was removed from the Chrome Extension store in September 2014.

== Reception ==
NotScripts was described by Martin Brinkmann of Ghacks as the first extension to bring some of NoScript's functionality to Chrome. In comparison, he remarked that NoScript on Firefox additionally offered cross-site scripting (XSS) protection.

== ScriptBlock ==
The extension was picked up by another developer and continued under the name ScriptBlock. The ScriptBlock chrome extension is blocked by chrome since February 15, 2018. Reason reported: "This extension violates the Chrome Web Store policy."

== See also ==
- NoScript
