= IceWeasel =

IceWeasel, iceweasel, or ice weasel can refer to:

- Debian Iceweasel, was a web browser based on Mozilla Firefox, distributed by the Debian project between 2006 and 2017 due to the Debian-Mozilla trademark dispute.
- GNU IceCat, a Mozilla Firefox web browser formerly known as GNU IceWeasel
