= Mellowtel =

Monetization and web scraping library

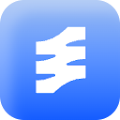
- Operating system: Web browser; macOS; Windows; Linux
- Platform: Cross-platform
- Type: Monetization
- License: LGPL-3.0
- Website: mellowtel.com

Mellowtel is a monetization platform that enables software developers to generate revenue by facilitating the sharing of users' bandwidth and computing resources for commercial purposes.

The service enables users to opt-in to share a portion of their internet bandwidth, which is then utilized by third-party companies, including artificial intelligence firms, for activities such as web scraping and operating AI web agents.

The platform is designed to be integrated into browser extensions, applications, and websites through a software development kit (SDK). Alternatively, developers can generate revenue by referring users to Mellowtel's official browser plugin for Chrome and Edge through referral links.

Developers may offer access to premium features or other incentives as compensation for their contribution to users who participate in bandwidth sharing.

== Overview ==
The Mellowtel software is an open-source library marketed especially toward browser extension developers as a way to earn money by allowing their user's to opt-in to share their "unused bandwidth". When activated, it creates temporary iframes in a sessionless way to scrape public web pages on behalf of AI companies. Revenue generated from these services is shared with developers whose users have opted into the program.

== Criticism ==
Mellowtel has received criticism regarding privacy and security from John Tuckner of SecurityAnnex. Tuckner raised concerns about the platform's collection of users' IP addresses and bandwidth speed, as well as its removal of Content Security Policy headers. Additionally, a news article by CyberInsider noted considerations regarding internal resource access when the software operates on internal networks.

Mellowtel has addressed the criticism in a blog post published on its website. The company states that its open-source code demonstrates that no personal or browsing data is collected from users, and that user anonymity is maintained. Users can adjust their participation settings through the developer's application interface or directly via Mellowtel's user control page. Regarding security concerns, Mellowtel has stated that Content Security Policy modifications occur only at the sub-frame level and do not affect users' browsing security.

== Adoption ==
The software has gained wide adoption among browser extension developers and website owners as a monetization tool. According to reports, developers have documented earnings in the thousands of dollars through the platform. Proponents have characterized it as a privacy-conscious alternative to traditional advertising-based revenue models.

Mellowtel positions the service as enabling developers to establish sustainable income streams while simultaneously addressing public web access needs within the artificial intelligence industry.
