= Resource sharing =

Resource sharing may refer to:

- Shared resource, a resource available from host to host on a computer network
- Interlibrary loan, a book and media sharing system

== See also ==
- Cross-origin resource sharing, a mechanism to access restricted resources on a web page from another domain
- Resource allocation, in economics, the assignment of available resources to various uses
