= Flashblock =

Mozilla Firefox extension

- Developer(s): Philip Chee
- Initial release: 28 January 2004; 21 years ago
- Stable release: 1.5.20 (December 6, 2015; 9 years ago) [±]
- Preview release: 1.3.21 for Seamonkey / 7 December 2014; 10 years ago
- Operating system: Cross-platform
- Available in: 34 languages
- Type: Firefox extension
- License: MPL1.1/GPL 2.0/LGPL 2.1
- Website: flashblock.mozdev.org

Flashblock is a discontinued Flash content-filtering Firefox extension for Mozilla Firefox and SeaMonkey.

== Extension ==
Flashblock allows users to prevent page elements, such as HTML object tag browser plug-ins and advertisements, from being displayed. Flashblock neither stops the download of Flash content nor does it prevent its execution completely.

The extension uses XBL and CSS to prevent elements of Silverlight, Macromedia Authorware, Adobe Director and Adobe Flash from being displayed. Flashblock does not prevent the elements from being downloaded.

Flashblock provides a mechanism that allows users to display the blocked elements by clicking on them, or by whitelisting.

Flashblock is based on a bookmarklet by Jesse Ruderman.

== Reception ==
In 2006, InformationWeek recommended Flashblock, and described it as one of the most popular Firefox extensions. Lifehacker advocated its use in 2009. It was reviewed by download.com in 2011, by Softpedia, and in 2016 Tomsguide.com included it in its "40 Best Firefox Browser Add-Ons".

== See also ==
- Adblock Plus
- NoScript
- List of Firefox extensions
