= XMLHttpRequest =

Web API to transfer data between a web browser and a web server

XMLHttpRequest (XHR) is an API in the form of a JavaScript object whose methods transmit HTTP requests from a web browser to a web server. The methods allow a browser-based application to send requests to the server after page loading is complete, and receive information back. XMLHttpRequest is a component of Ajax programming. Prior to Ajax, hyperlinks and form submissions were the primary mechanisms for interacting with the server, often replacing the current page with another one.

== History ==
The concept behind XMLHttpRequest was conceived in 2000 by the developers of Microsoft Outlook. The concept was then implemented within the Internet Explorer 5 browser (1999). However, the original syntax did not use the XMLHttpRequest identifier. Instead, the developers used the identifiers ActiveXObject("Msxml2.XMLHTTP") and ActiveXObject("Microsoft.XMLHTTP"). As of Internet Explorer 7 (2006), all browsers support the XMLHttpRequest identifier.

The XMLHttpRequest identifier is now the de facto standard in all the major browsers, including Mozilla's Gecko layout engine (2002), Safari 1.2 (2004) and Opera 8.0 (2005).

=== Standards ===
The World Wide Web Consortium (W3C) published a Working Draft specification for the XMLHttpRequest object on April 5, 2006. (Note: The standard was edited by Anne van Kesteren of Opera Software and Dean Jackson of W3C.) On February 25, 2008, the W3C published the Working Draft Level 2 specification. Level 2 added methods to monitor event progress, allow cross-site requests, and handle byte streams. At the end of 2011, the Level 2 specification was absorbed into the original specification.

At the end of 2012, the WHATWG took over development and maintains a living document using Web IDL.

== Usage ==
Example in TypeScript.

// Create XMLHttpRequest object
const xhr = new XMLHttpRequest();

// Configure request: GET method, URL, Async flag (true) makes script not stop while waiting for response
xhr.open('GET', 'https://example.com', true);

// Set event listeners

xhr.onload = () => {
    // The request is done. Log response status code and text
    console.log(xhr.status, xhr.responseText);
};

xhr.onerror = () => {
    console.log('Network error occurred');
};

// Send request
xhr.send();

Aside from these general steps, XMLHttpRequest has many options to control how the request is sent and how the response is processed. Custom header fields can be added to the request to indicate how the server should fulfill it, and data can be uploaded to the server by providing it in the "send" call. The response can be parsed from the JSON format into a readily usable JavaScript object, or processed gradually as it arrives rather than waiting for the entire text. The request can be aborted prematurely or set to fail if not completed in a specified amount of time.

== Cross-domain requests ==
In the early development of the World Wide Web, it was found possible to breach users' security by the use of JavaScript to exchange information from one web site with that from another less reputable one. All modern browsers therefore implement a same origin policy that prevents many such attacks, such as cross-site scripting. XMLHttpRequest data is subject to this security policy, but sometimes web developers want to intentionally circumvent its restrictions. This is sometimes due to the legitimate use of subdomains as, for example, making an XMLHttpRequest from a page created by foo.example.com for information from bar.example.com will normally fail.

Various alternatives exist to circumvent this security feature, including using JSONP, Cross-Origin Resource Sharing (CORS) or alternatives with plugins such as Flash or Silverlight (both now deprecated). Cross-origin XMLHttpRequest is specified in W3C's XMLHttpRequest Level 2 specification. Internet Explorer did not implement CORS until version 10. The two previous versions (8 and 9) offered similar functionality through the XDomainRequest (XDR) API. CORS is now supported by all modern browsers (desktop and mobile).

The CORS protocol has several restrictions, with two models of support. The simple model does not allow setting custom request headers and omits cookies. Further, only the HEAD, GET and POST request methods are supported, and POST only allows the following MIME types: "text/plain", "application/x-www-urlencoded" and "multipart/form-data". Only "text/plain" was initially supported. The other model detects when one of the non-simple features are requested and sends a pre-flight request to the server to negotiate the feature.

== Fetch alternative ==
Program flow using asynchronous XHR callbacks can present difficulty with readability and maintenance. ECMAScript 2015 (ES6) added the promise construct to simplify asynchronous logic. Browsers have since implemented the alternative fetch() interface to achieve the same functionality as XHR using promises instead of callbacks.

Fetch is also standardized by WHATWG.

=== Example ===
fetch('/api/message')
    .then((response) => {
        if (response.status !== 200) {
            throw new Error('Request failed');
        }
        return response.text();
    })
    .then((text) => {
        console.log(text);
    })
    .catch((error) => {
        console.error(error.message);
    });

== See also ==
- WebSocket
- Representational state transfer (REST)
