= GNU LibreJS =

Browser add-on to block nonfree nontrivial JavaScript

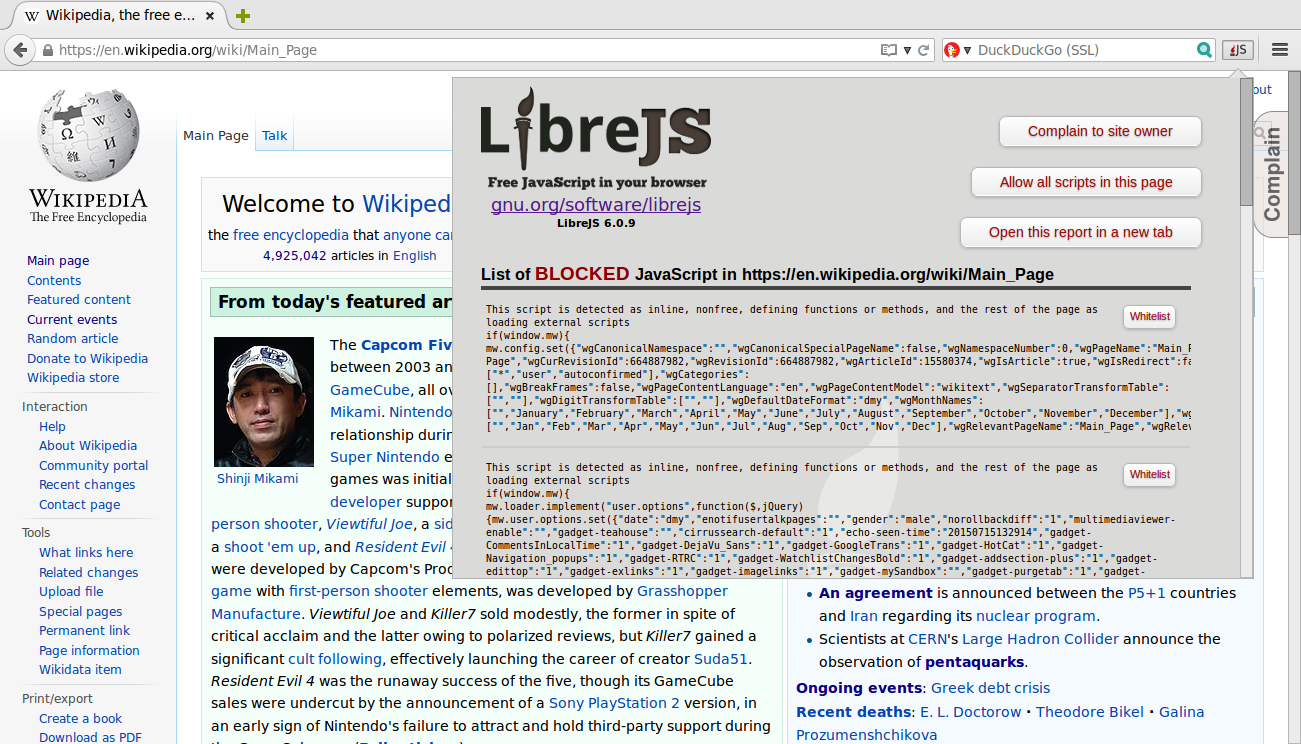
- GNU LibreJS 6.0.9 showing the blocked elements on the English Wikipedia main page.
- Developer: Yuchen Pei
- Stable release: 7.21.1 / 17 September 2023
- Type: Browser extension
- License: GPL-3.0-or-later
- Website: gnu.org/software/librejs/
- Repository: git.savannah.gnu.org/cgit/librejs.git

GNU LibreJS, or simply LibreJS, is a free software web browser extension for Mozilla Firefox-based browsers, written by the GNU Project. Its purpose is to block nonfree nontrivial JavaScript programs and allow free or trivial JS in a user's web browser. The add-on was written to address the so-called "JavaScript Trap" first described by Richard Stallman in 2009, a situation in which many users unknowingly run proprietary software in their web browsers.

== Description ==
GNU LibreJS refuses to run nonfree programs that are present in many websites. It is developed as part of the GNU Project by Yuchen Pei and is included by default in the GNU IceCat browser. It can also work with Tor.

The add-on allows site whitelisting and has an email address detection system for users to contact page webmasters in order to persuade them into making their JavaScript code compliant with LibreJS. According to the Free Software Foundation, many websites (if not whitelisted) break while using the add-on, due to the pervasiveness of proprietary JavaScript code on the web. Nevertheless, programmer and activist Richard Stallman supports the usage of GNU LibreJS.

Criticizing Google, Stallman said, "In general, most Google services require the execution of non-free JavaScript code. If you refuse to do so (for example, by running LibreJS), you will see that you will not be able to use these services."

== Reception ==
Klint Finley of Wired, after going without JavaScript for a week, wrote, "The Free Software Foundation launched its Free JavaScript campaign in 2013 to promote websites using only free and open source JavaScript code, or making sites function without it. To help users avoid running proprietary JavaScript, they developed LibreJS, a plugin for the Firefox web browser that blocks most, but not all, JavaScript from running. They also work with engineers to help reduce dependence on proprietary JavaScript." However, the FSF does not use the term "open source" and actively advocates against using it, preferring the term "free software" instead.

Cory Doctorow of BoingBoing, discussing Finley's article, said he had used NoScript for years, and got around the problems Finley identified by whitelisting pages with wanted functionality that only works with JavaScript.

Websites have been criticized or rated based on whether they work without JavaScript or with LibreJS enabled.

== See also ==
- NoScript
