= Parameter validation =

In computer software, the term parameter validation is the automated processing, in a module, to validate the spelling or accuracy of parameters passed to that module. The term has been in common use for over 30 years. Specific best practices have been developed, for decades, to improve the handling of such parameters.

Parameter validation can be used to defend against cross-site scripting attacks.

== See also ==
- Data validation
- Strong typing
- Error handling
- Sanity check
