= GNU IceCat =

Firefox derivative containing only free software

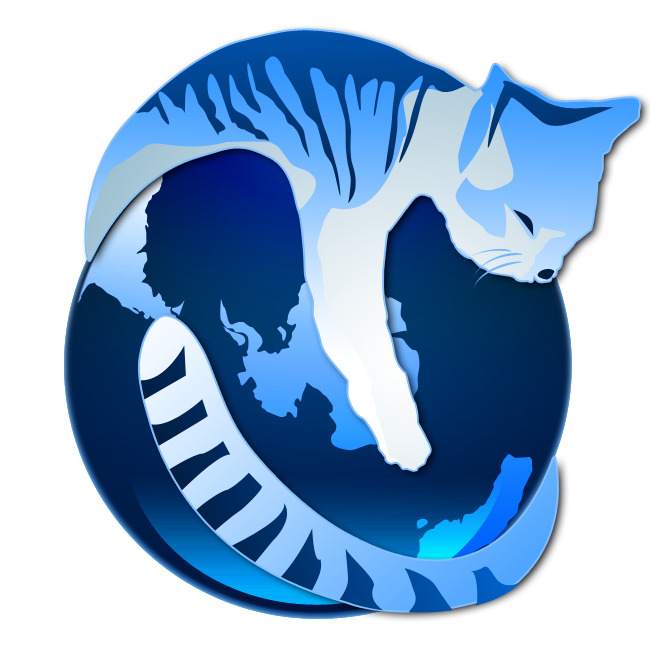

- GNU IceCat new-tab page
- Developers: GNUzilla team, GNU Project
- Stable release: 140.11.0 / 18 May 2026
- Engine: Gecko
- Operating system: Linux; Windows; macOS; Android
- Type: Web browser
- License: MPL-2.0 (source files from Mozilla Firefox browser); GPL-3.0-or-later (Scripts to convert Firefox into IceCat)
- Website: www.gnu.org/software/gnuzilla/
- Repository: git.savannah.gnu.org/cgit/gnuzilla.git

GNU IceCat, formerly known as GNU IceWeasel, is a version of the Mozilla Firefox web browser distributed by the GNU Project that exclusively comprises free software. Its official releases were compatible with Linux, Windows, Android and macOS. Currently, official releases of IceCat are being distributed only through GNU Guix.

IceCat is released as a part of GNUzilla, GNU's rebranding of a code base that used to be the Mozilla Application Suite. As an internet suite, GNUzilla also includes a mail and newsgroup program, and an HTML composer.

Mozilla produces free and open-source software, but the binaries include trademarked artwork. The GNU Project attempts to keep IceCat in synchronization with upstream development of Firefox ESR (long-term support versions) while removing all trademarked artwork and non-free add-ons. It also maintains a large list of free software plugins. In addition, it includes several security and privacy features not found in the mainline Firefox browser.

== History ==
=== Origins of the name ===
The Mozilla Corporation holds the trademark to the Firefox name and denies the use of the name "Firefox" to unofficial builds that fall outside certain guidelines. Unless distributions use the binary files supplied by Mozilla, fall within the stated guidelines, or else have special permission, they must compile the Firefox source with a compile-time option that creates binaries without the official branding of Firefox and related artwork, using either the included free artwork or an alternative specified by the person doing the build.

This policy led to a long debate within the Debian Project in 2004 and 2005. During this debate, the name "Iceweasel" was coined to refer to rebranded versions of Firefox. The first known use of the name in this context is by Nathanael Nerode, in reply to Eric Dorland's suggestion of "Icerabbit". It was intended as a parody of "Firefox". Iceweasel was subsequently used as the example name for a rebranded Firefox in the Mozilla Trademark Policy, and became the most commonly used name for a hypothetical rebranded version of Firefox. By January 1, 2005, rebranding was being referred to as the "Iceweasel route".

In August 2005, the GNUzilla project adopted the GNU IceWeasel name for a rebranded distribution of Firefox that made no references to nonfree plugins.

The term "ice weasel" appeared earlier in a line which cartoonist Matt Groening fictionally attributed to Friedrich Nietzsche: "Love is a snowmobile racing across the tundra and then suddenly it flips over, pinning you underneath. At night, the ice weasels come."

Debian was originally given permission to use the trademarks, and adopted the Firefox name. However, because the artwork in Firefox had a proprietary copyright license at the time, which was not compatible with the Debian Free Software Guidelines, the substituted logo had to remain. In 2006, Mozilla withdrew their permission for Debian to use the Firefox name due to significant changes to the browser that Mozilla deemed outside the boundaries of its policy, changes which Debian felt were important enough to keep, and Debian revived the Iceweasel name in its place.

Subsequently, on 23 September 2007, one of the developers of the GNU IceWeasel package announced that the name would be changed to GNU IceCat from IceWeasel in the next release, so as to avoid confusion with Debian's separately maintained, unrelated rebranding of Firefox. The name change took place as planned and IceCat is the current name.

IceCat was ported to the Firefox 3 codebase during Google Summer of Code of 2008.

== Distribution ==
GNU IceCat is freely downloadable as source code from the GNU project.

Some Linux Distributions offer binary and source packages through their repositories, such as Trisquel, Parabola GNU/Linux-libre and Fedora.

As of 2024, there are unofficial IceCat releases distributed for Windows, macOS and GNU/Linux.

GNU IceCat is available for macOS 10.14 and higher.

== Additional security and privacy features ==
IceCat includes additional security features, such as the option to block third party zero-length image files resulting in third-party cookies, also known as web bugs (This feature is available in Firefox 1.0, 1.5, and 3.0, but the UI option was absent on 2.0). GNU IceCat also provides warnings for URL redirection.

In version 3.0.2-g1, the certificate of a certificate authority CAcert.org has been added to the list of trusted root certificates. Concern about that decision has been raised in a discussion on the savannah-hackers-public mailing list.

The GNU LibreJS extension detects and blocks non-trivial occurrences of proprietary JavaScript.

IceCat also has functionality to set a different user agent string each for different domains in about:config. For example, setting a mobile user agent string for a desired DNS domain would make it possible to view the mobile version of a website on a desktop operating system.

== Licensing ==
Gnuzilla is available under the MPL/GPL/LGPL tri-license that Mozilla used for source code. Unlike Mozilla, IceCat's default icons are under the same tri-license.

== See also ==
- Comparison of web browsers
- Firefox version history
- Debian–Mozilla trademark dispute
- SeaMonkey, a more traditional continuation of Mozilla Suite
- Hyperbola GNU/Linux-libre's fork of Basilisk but with a similar name known as Iceweasel-UXP
