= HTML5 =

Fifth and previous version of HyperText Markup Language

- Filename extension: .html, .htm
- Internet media type: text/html
- Type code: TEXT
- Uniform Type Identifier (UTI): public.html
- Developed by: WHATWG; World Wide Web Consortium (W3C; formerly)
- Initial release: 22 January 2008 (18 years ago)
- Latest release: 5.2 (Second revision); 14 December 2017 (8 years ago)
- Type of format: Markup language
- Extended from: HTML4, XHTML1, DOM2 HTML
- Extended to: HTML LS
- Standard: HTML 5.2
- Open format?: Yes

HTML5 (Hypertext Markup Language 5) is a markup language used for structuring and presenting hypertext documents on the World Wide Web. It was the fifth and final major HTML version that is now a retired World Wide Web Consortium (W3C) recommendation. The current specification is known as the HTML Living Standard. It is maintained by the Web Hypertext Application Technology Working Group (WHATWG), a consortium of the major browser vendors (Apple, Google, Mozilla, and Microsoft).

HTML5 was first released in a public-facing form on 22 January 2008, with a major update and "W3C Recommendation" status in October 2014. Its goals were to improve the language with support for the latest multimedia and other new features; to keep the language both easily readable by humans and consistently understood by computers and devices such as web browsers, parsers, etc., without XHTML's rigidity; and to remain backward-compatible with older software. HTML5 is intended to subsume not only HTML 4 but also XHTML1 and even the DOM Level 2 HTML itself.

HTML5 includes detailed processing models to encourage more interoperable implementations; it extends, improves, and rationalizes the markup available for documents and introduces markup and application programming interfaces (APIs) for complex web applications. For the same reasons, HTML5 is also a candidate for cross-platform mobile applications because it includes features designed with low-powered devices in mind.

Many new syntactic features are included. To natively include and handle multimedia and graphical content, the new <video>, <audio> and <canvas> elements were added; expandable sections are natively implemented through <summary>...</summary> and <details>...</details> rather than depending on CSS or JavaScript; and support for scalable vector graphics (SVG) content and MathML for mathematical formulas was also added. To enrich the semantic content of documents, new page structure elements such as <main>, <section>, <article>, <header>, <footer>, <aside>, <nav>, and <figure> are added. New attributes were introduced, some elements and attributes were removed, and others such as <a>, <cite>, and <menu> were changed, redefined, or standardized. The APIs and Document Object Model (DOM) are now fundamental parts of the HTML5 specification, and HTML5 also better defines the processing for any invalid documents.

== History ==
The Web Hypertext Application Technology Working Group (WHATWG) began work on the new standard in 2004. At that time, HTML 4.01 had not been updated since 2000, and the World Wide Web Consortium (W3C) was focusing future developments on XHTML 2.0. In 2009, the W3C allowed the XHTML 2.0 Working Group's charter to expire and decided not to renew it.

The Mozilla Foundation and Opera Software presented a position paper at a World Wide Web Consortium workshop in June 2004, focusing on developing technologies that are backward-compatible with existing browsers, including an initial draft specification of Web Forms 2.0. The workshop concluded with a vote—8 for, 14 against—for continuing work on HTML. Immediately after the workshop, WHATWG was formed to start work based upon that position paper, and a second draft, Web Applications 1.0, was also announced. The two specifications were later merged to form HTML5. The HTML5 specification was adopted as the starting point of the work of the new HTML working group of the W3C in 2007.

WHATWG's Ian Hickson (Google) and David Hyatt (Apple) produced W3C's first public working draft of the specification on 22 January 2008.

Many web browsers released after 2009 support HTML5, including Google Chrome 3.0, Safari 3.1, Firefox 3.5, Opera 10.5, Internet Explorer 9 and later.

=== "Thoughts on Flash" ===
While some features of HTML5 are often compared to Adobe Flash, the two technologies are very different. Both include features for playing audio and video within web pages, and for using vector graphics. However, HTML5 on its own cannot be used for animation or interactivity – it must be supplemented with CSS3 or JavaScript. There are many Flash capabilities that have no direct counterpart in HTML5 (see Comparison of HTML5 and Flash). HTML5's interactive capabilities became a topic of mainstream media attention around April 2010 after Apple Inc.'s then-CEO Steve Jobs issued a public letter titled "Thoughts on Flash" in which he concluded that "Flash is no longer necessary to watch video or consume any kind of web content" and that "new open standards created in the mobile era, such as HTML5, will win". This sparked a debate in web development circles suggesting that, while HTML5 provides enhanced functionality, developers must consider the varying browser support of the different parts of the standard as well as other functionality differences between HTML5 and Flash. In early November 2011, Adobe announced that it would discontinue the development of the Flash Player browser plugin for mobile devices and reorient its efforts in developing tools using HTML5. On 25 July 2017, Adobe announced that both the distribution and support of Flash would cease by the end of 2020. Adobe itself officially discontinued Flash on 31 December 2020, and all Flash content was blocked from running in Flash Player as of 12 January 2021.

=== Last call, candidacy, and recommendation stages ===
On 14 February 2011, the W3C extended the charter of its HTML Working Group with clear milestones for HTML5. In May 2011, the working group advanced HTML5 to "Last Call", an invitation to communities inside and outside W3C to confirm the technical soundness of the specification. The W3C developed a comprehensive test suite to achieve broad interoperability for the full specification by 2014, which was the target date for recommendation. In January 2011, the WHATWG renamed its "HTML5" specification HTML Living Standard. The W3C nevertheless continued its project to release HTML5.

In July 2012, WHATWG and W3C decided on a degree of separation. W3C will continue the HTML5 specification work, focusing on a single definitive standard, which is considered a "snapshot" by WHATWG. The WHATWG organization continues its work with HTML5 as a "living standard". The concept of a living standard is that it is never complete and is always being updated and improved. New features can be added but functionality will not be removed.

In December 2012, W3C designated HTML5 as a Candidate Recommendation. The criterion for advancement to W3C Recommendation is "two 100% complete and fully interoperable implementations".

On 16 September 2014, W3C moved HTML5 to Proposed Recommendation. On 28 October 2014, HTML5 was released as a W3C Recommendation, bringing the specification process to completion. On 1 November 2016, HTML 5.1 was released as a W3C Recommendation. On 14 December 2017, HTML 5.2 was released as a W3C Recommendation.

=== Retirement ===
The W3C retired HTML5 on 27 March 2018. Additionally, the retirement included HTML 4.0, HTML 4.01, XHTML 1.0, and XHTML 1.1. HTML 5.1, HTML 5.2 and HTML 5.3 were all retired on 28 January 2021, in favour of the HTML living standard.

=== Timeline ===
The combined timelines for the W3C recommendations of HTML5, HTML 5.1, HTML 5.2 and HTML 5.3:

Version	First draft	Candidate recommendation	Recommendation	Retired
HTML5	1 May 2007	17 December 2012	28 October 2014	27 March 2018
HTML 5.1	17 December 2012	21 June 2016	1 November 2016	28 January 2021
HTML 5.1; 2nd Edition	—N/a	20 June 2017	3 October 2017	28 January 2021
HTML 5.2	18 August 2016	8 August 2017	14 December 2017	28 January 2021
HTML 5.3	14 December 2017	—N/a	—N/a	28 January 2021

=== W3C and WHATWG conflict ===
The W3C ceded authority over the HTML and DOM standards to WHATWG on 28 May 2019, as it considered that having two standards is harmful. The HTML Living Standard is now authoritative. However, W3C will still participate in the development process of HTML.

Before the ceding of authority, W3C and WHATWG had been characterized as both working together on the development of HTML5, and yet also at cross purposes ever since the July 2012 split. The W3C "HTML5" standard was snapshot-based (HTML5, HTML 5.1, etc.) and static, while the WHATWG "HTML living standard" is continually updated. The relationship had been described as "fragile", even a "rift", and characterized by "squabbling".

In at least one case, namely the permissible content of the <cite> element, the two specifications directly contradicted each other (as of July 2018), with the W3C definition allowing a broader range of uses than the WHATWG definition.

The "Introduction" section in the WHATWG spec (edited by Ian "Hixie" Hickson) is critical of W3C, e.g. "Note: Although we have asked them to stop doing so, the W3C also republishes some parts of this specification as separate documents." In its "History" subsection it portrays W3C as resistant to Hickson's and WHATWG's original HTML5 plans, then jumping on the bandwagon belatedly (though Hickson was in control of the W3C HTML5 spec, too). Regardless, it indicates a major philosophical divide between the organizations:

For a number of years, both groups then worked together. In 2011, however, the groups came to the conclusion that they had different goals: the W3C wanted to publish a "finished" version of "HTML5", while the WHATWG wanted to continue working on a Living Standard for HTML, continuously maintaining the specification rather than freezing it in a state with known problems, and adding new features as needed to evolve the platform.

Since then, the WHATWG has been working on this specification (amongst others), and the W3C has been copying fixes made by the WHATWG into their fork of the document (which also has other changes).

The two entities signed an agreement to work together on a single version of HTML on 28 May 2019.

==== Differences between the two standards ====
In addition to the contradiction in the <cite> element mentioned above, other differences between the two standards include at least the following, as of September 2018:

Content or Features Unique to W3C or WHATWG Standard
Feature	W3C	WHATWG
Site pagination		Single page version (allows global search of contents)
Chapters		§5 Microdata §9 Communication §10 Web workers §11 Web storage
Global attributes	: class, id	: autocapitalize, enterkeyhint, inputmode, is, itemid, itemprop, itemref, itemscope, itemtype, nonce
Chapter Elements of HTML		§4.13 Custom elements
Elements	<rb>, <rtc> (See compatibility notes below.) <address> is in section Grouping content.	<hgroup>, <menu>, <slot> (See compatibility notes below.) <address> is in section Sections.
§ <meta>	§4.2.5.4. Other pragma directives, based on deprecated WHATWG procedure.	
§ Sections		§ 4.3.11.2 Sample outlines § 4.3.11.3 Exposing outlines to users
Structured data	Recommends RDFa (code examples, separate specs, no special attributes).	Recommends Microdata (code examples, spec chapter, special attributes).

The following table provides data from the Mozilla Development Network on compatibility with major browsers, as of September 2018, of HTML elements unique to one of the standards:

Element	Standard	Compatibility	Note
<rb>	W3C	All browsers, except Edge	
<rtc>	W3C	All browsers, except IE	
<hgroup>	WHATWG	All browsers	"[Since] the HTML outline algorithm is not implemented in any browsers ... the <hgroup> semantics are in practice only theoretical."
<menu>	WHATWG	All browsers	
<slot>	WHATWG	All browsers	

== Features and APIs ==
The W3C proposed a greater reliance on modularity as a key part of the plan to make faster progress, meaning identifying specific features, either proposed or already existing in the spec, and advancing them as separate specifications. Some technologies that were originally defined in HTML5 itself are now defined in separate specifications:

- HTML Working Group — HTML Canvas 2D Context;
- Immersive Web Working Group — WebXR Device API, WebXR Gamepads Module, WebXR Augmented Reality Module, and others;
- Web Apps Working Group — Web Messaging, Web workers, Web storage, WebSocket, Server-sent events, Web Components (this was not part of HTML5, though); the Web Applications Working Group was closed in October 2015 and its deliverables transferred to the Web Platform Working Group (WPWG).
- IETF HyBi Working Group — WebSocket Protocol;
- WebRTC Working Group — WebRTC;
- Web Media Text Tracks Community Group — WebVTT.

Some features that were removed from the original HTML5 specification have been standardized separately as modules, such as Microdata and Canvas. Technical specifications introduced as HTML5 extensions such as Polyglot markup have also been standardized as modules. Some W3C specifications that were originally separate specifications have been adapted as HTML5 extensions or features, such as SVG. Some features that might have slowed down the standardization of HTML5 were or will be standardized as upcoming specifications, instead.

== Features ==
=== Markup ===
HTML5 introduces elements and attributes that reflect typical usage on modern websites. Some of them are semantic replacements for common uses of generic block (<div>) and inline (<span>) elements, for example <nav> (website navigation block), <footer> (usually referring to bottom of web page or to last lines of HTML code), or <audio> and <video> instead of <object>. Some deprecated elements from HTML 4.01 have been dropped, including purely presentational elements such as <font> and <center>, whose effects have long been superseded by the more capable Cascading Style Sheets. There is also a renewed emphasis on the importance of client-side JavaScript used to create dynamic web pages.

The HTML5 syntax is no longer based on SGML despite the similarity of its markup. It has, however, been designed to be backward-compatible with common parsing of older versions of HTML. It comes with a new introductory line that looks like an SGML document type declaration, <!DOCTYPE html>, which triggers the standards-compliant rendering mode. Since 5 January 2009, HTML5 also includes Web Forms 2.0, a previously separate WHATWG specification.

=== New APIs ===
HTML5 related APIs

In addition to specifying markup, HTML5 specifies scripting application programming interfaces (APIs) that can be used with JavaScript. Existing Document Object Model (DOM) interfaces are extended and de facto features documented. There are also new APIs, such as:

- Canvas;
- Timed Media Playback;
- Offline;
- Editable content;
- Drag and drop;
- History;
- MIME type and protocol handler registration;
- Microdata;
- Web Messaging;
- Web Storage – a key-value pair storage framework that provides behavior similar to cookies but with larger storage capacity and improved API.

Not all of the above technologies are included in the W3C HTML5 specification, though they are in the WHATWG HTML specification. Some related technologies, which are not part of either the W3C HTML5 or the WHATWG HTML specification, are as follows. The W3C publishes specifications for these separately:

- Geolocation;
- IndexedDB – an indexed hierarchical key-value store (formerly WebSimpleDB);
- File – an API intended to handle file uploads and file manipulation;
- Directories and System – an API intended to satisfy client-side-storage use cases not well served by databases;
- File Writer – an API for writing to files from web applications;
- Web Audio – a high-level JavaScript API for processing and synthesizing audio in web applications;
- ClassList.
- Web cryptography API
- WebRTC
- Web SQL Database – a local SQL Database (no longer maintained);

HTML5 cannot provide animation within web pages. Additional JavaScript or CSS3 is necessary for animating HTML elements. Animation is also possible using JavaScript and HTML 4, and within SVG elements through SMIL, although browser support of the latter remains uneven as of 2011.

=== XHTML5 (XML-serialized HTML5) ===
XML documents must be served with an XML Internet media type (often called "MIME type") such as application/xhtml+xml or application/xml, and must conform to strict, well-formed syntax of XML. XHTML5 is simply XML-serialized HTML5 data (that is, HTML5 constrained to XHTML's strict requirements, e.g., not having any unclosed tags), sent with one of XML media types. HTML that has been written to conform to both the HTML and XHTML specifications and therefore produces the same DOM tree whether parsed as HTML or XML is known as polyglot markup.

There is no DTD for XHTML5.

Warning! Using the XML syntax is not recommended, for reasons which include the fact that there is no specification which defines the rules for how an XML parser must map a string of bytes or characters into a Document object, as well as the fact that the XML syntax is essentially unmaintained — in that, it’s not expected that any further features will ever be added to the XML syntax (even when such features have been added to the HTML syntax).

— https://html.spec.whatwg.org/multipage/xhtml.html

=== Error handling ===
HTML5 is designed so that old browsers can safely ignore new HTML5 constructs. In contrast to HTML 4.01, the HTML5 specification gives detailed rules for lexing and parsing, with the intent that compliant browsers will produce the same results when parsing incorrect syntax. Although HTML5 now defines a consistent behavior for "tag soup" documents, those documents do not conform to the HTML5 standard.

=== Popularity ===
According to a report released on 30 September 2011, 34 of the world's top 100 Web sites were using HTML5 – the adoption led by search engines and social networks. Another report released in August 2013 has shown that 153 of the Fortune 500 U.S. companies implemented HTML5 on their corporate websites.

Since 2014, HTML5 is at least partially supported by most popular layout engines.

=== Differences from HTML 4.01 and XHTML 1.x ===
The following is a cursory list of differences and some specific examples.

- New parsing rules: oriented towards flexible parsing and compatibility; not based on SGML
- Ability to use inline SVG and MathML in text/html
- New elements: article, aside, audio, bdi, canvas, command, data, datalist, details, embed, figcaption, figure, footer, header, keygen, mark, meter, nav, output, progress, rp, rt, ruby, section, source, summary, time, track, video, wbr
- New types of form controls: dates and times, email, url, search, number, range, tel, color
- New attributes: charset (on meta), async (on script)
- Global attributes (that can be applied for every element): id, tabindex, hidden, data-* (custom data attributes)
- Deprecated elements will be dropped altogether: acronym, applet, basefont, big, center, dir, font, frame, frameset, isindex, noframes, strike, tt

W3C Working Group publishes "HTML5 differences from HTML 4", which provides a complete outline of additions, removals and changes between HTML5 and HTML4.

== Logo ==
The W3C HTML5 logo

On 18 January 2011, the W3C introduced a logo to represent the use of or interest in HTML5. Unlike other badges previously issued by the W3C, it does not imply validity or conformance to a certain standard. As of 1 April 2011, this logo is official.

When initially presenting it to the public, the W3C announced the HTML5 logo as a "general-purpose visual identity for a broad set of open web technologies, including HTML5, CSS, SVG, WOFF, and others". Some web standard advocates, including The Web Standards Project, criticized that definition of "HTML5" as an umbrella term, pointing out the blurring of terminology and the potential for miscommunication. Three days later, the W3C responded to community feedback and changed the logo's definition, dropping the enumeration of related technologies. The W3C then said the logo "represents HTML5, the cornerstone for modern Web applications".

== Digital rights management ==
Industry players including the BBC, Google, Microsoft, and Apple Inc. have been lobbying for the inclusion of Encrypted Media Extensions (EME), a form of digital rights management (DRM), into the HTML5 standard. As of the end of 2012 and the beginning of 2013, 27 organizations including the Free Software Foundation have started a campaign against including digital rights management in the HTML5 standard. However, in late September 2013, the W3C HTML Working Group decided that Encrypted Media Extensions, a form of DRM, was "in scope" and will potentially be included in the HTML 5.1 standard. WHATWG's "HTML Living Standard" continued to be developed without DRM-enabled proposals.

Manu Sporny, a member of the W3C, said that EME would not solve the problem it was supposed to address. Opponents point out that EME itself is just an architecture for a DRM plug-in mechanism.

The initial enablers for DRM in HTML5 were Google and Microsoft. Supporters also include Adobe. On 14 May 2014, Mozilla announced plans to support EME in Firefox, the last major browser to avoid DRM. Calling it "a difficult and uncomfortable step", Andreas Gal of Mozilla explained that future versions of Firefox would remain open source but ship with a sandbox designed to run a content decryption module developed by Adobe, later it was replaced with Widevine module from Google which is much more widely adopted by content providers. While promising to "work on alternative solutions", Mozilla's Executive Chair Mitchell Baker stated that a refusal to implement EME would have accomplished little more than convincing many users to switch browsers. This decision was condemned by Cory Doctorow and the Free Software Foundation.

As of December 2023, the W3C defended their formation of the EME standard, stating: "Encrypted Media Extensions (EME) brings greater interoperability, better privacy, security, accessibility and user experience in viewing movies and TV on the Web".

== See also ==
- Cache manifest in HTML5
- Canvas element
- Dave Hyatt, Apple's editor of HTML5 specs
- Ian Hickson, Google's main editor of HTML5 specs
- Polyglot markup
