= Comparison of HTML5 and Flash =

Modern HTML5 has feature-parity with the now-obsolete Adobe Flash. Both include features for playing audio and video within web pages. Flash was specifically built to integrate vector graphics and light games in a web page, features that HTML5 also supports.

As of December 31, 2020, Adobe no longer supports Flash Player. As of January 12, 2021, they have blocked Flash content from running in Flash Player.

The HTML5 specification does not itself define ways to do animation and interactivity within web pages. "HTML5" in this article sometimes refers not only to the HTML5 specification, but to HTML5 and related standards like SVG, JavaScript and CSS 3.

Animation via JavaScript is also possible with HTML 4.

== Comparison table ==
The table below compares the features of the Flash platform, the HTML5 specification and the features implemented in modern web browsers.

	HTML5 standard	HTML web browser features	Adobe Flash/AIR features
Date started	Work began in 2003; Working Draft as of 2011	—N/a	Work began in 1996; Version 1 released in 1997
Desktop operating systems	—N/a	AmigaOS, MorphOS, Apple macOS, Linux, Microsoft Windows	Apple macOS, Linux, Microsoft Windows
Mobile operating systems	—N/a	Android 2.3 and newer; Apple iOS 6 and newer; ChromeOS; Symbian Belle; BlackBerry OS 7 and 10; Windows Phone 7 and newer	Android 2.1 to 4.1; Apple iOS (Adobe AIR only); BlackBerry 10 (up to OS 10.3.0); BlackBerry Tablet OS; Windows RT
Video game consoles	—N/a	PlayStation (PS4, PS3 and PS Vita); Nintendo Switch and Wii U; Nintendo 3DS family (partial); Xbox One and Xbox 360	PlayStation 3 (Flash 9.1) and PSP (Flash 6); Wii (Flash Lite 3.1, equivalent to Flash 8); Leapster (Flash 5 for games); Dreamcast (Flash 4)
Device support	—N/a	Full, permission-based access to web camera, microphone, accelerometer and GPS	
Market penetration	—N/a	82.3% of websites (as of March 28, 2020)	4.5% of websites (as of April 19, 2018)
Browser support	—N/a	97.5% of browser installations (as of February 2020)	29% of browser installations (as of July 2019)
Vector graphics formats	—N/a	Scalable Vector Graphics (SVG) supported on ~97% of browsers	SWF with embedded graphics and AS3SVGRenderer
Bitmap effects	Yes	90+% support of Filters in CSS3 (e.g. Glow, Blur, Drop Shadow, Sepia)	Yes, applied to text or graphics (e.g. Glow, Drop Shadow, Bevel)
Vector text display	Yes	Yes	Yes, with Saffron Type System
Font support	—N/a	Installed fonts and custom fonts using CSS 3 web fonts	Installed fonts and embedded fonts
Text anti-aliasing	—N/a	Yes, implemented in most browsers, for system and custom fonts	Yes, in most cases (Note: Static text created via Flash editor is automatically embedded and anti-aliased. Text fields created via ActionScript need fonts to be manually embedded for anti-aliasing to work.)
Text tab stops	No	Only supported inside "pre" tags	Yes, with Text Layout Framework
Liquid text layout	Yes	Yes, via "div" tag and CSS styling	No, but text fields can be resized in ActionScript
Tabular data	Yes	Yes, via "table" tag	No, but text fields can be arranged into a grid
Linked text frames (Note: Allows text to overflow into other text boxes, useful for desktop publishing.)	As of 2016, two specifications compete: CSS Regions and CSS Overflow	With CSS Regions, supported by Safari, IE11 and Edge	Yes, with Text Layout Framework
Programming languages	Depends	JavaScript	ActionScript, Pixel Bender
C++ support	Cross-compiling C++ code to JavaScript via Emscripten	Supported with WebAssembly	Cross-compiling C++ code to run in Flash Player via FlasCC AIR has AIR Native Extensions that allow loading native code, such as compiled C++ code.
Code delivery format	Plaintext	Plaintext JavaScript with limited obfuscation, WebAssembly bytecode, GLSL for GPUs, in Canvas elements	Compiled bytecode, can be obfuscated
Data formats	Depends	CSS 3, HTML, XML, JSON	JSON, XML, Subset of CSS 1
Data compression	No	GZIP compression for HTML, JS and CSS files	LZMA or DEFLATE for SWF files
Image formats	Depends	PNG, JPEG, SVG, Animated GIF (Note: SVG may be used by several ways: it may be included into an html source code or be linked as an image source to be displayed (e.g. in <img ... /> tag);)	PNG, JPEG, JPEG-XR, Single-frame GIF
Video formats	Depends	90+% support of H.264; varying support of WebM and Ogg Theora (see HTML video)	H.264, Sorenson Spark, and On2 VP6
Streaming video	Yes	Supported by IE, Edge, Firefox, Chrome, Safari and Opera.	Flash Video, H.264 and partial support for MP4
Audio formats	Depends	~94% support of MP3, AAC and WAV PCM; varying support of Ogg Vorbis, and WebM Vorbis (see HTML audio)	MP3, WAV and AAC audio files or embedded sound
Fullscreen support	Yes	Supported on all major desktop browsers, with warning displayed. Not yet widely supported on mobile	Yes, with warning displayed
Encryption DRM	Depends	~65% support of audio/video files. All other files being plaintext, except for obfuscation	No, binary formatted files can be decompiled, which is obfuscation
File system access	Depends	Single file upload, and drag and drop of files onto browser	Support for single file upload and generation, AIR only: full create/read/write access to file system
Bitmap manipulation	Depends	~95% support for canvas element	Yes, via BitmapData class
Binary manipulation	Yes	Yes, via JavaScript Typed Arrays	Yes, via ByteArray class
Large binary data	No	Via Web Sockets to stream binary or other data	Yes, embedded or streaming binary data
Offline storage	Depends	Yes, via Web storage, HTTP cookie, or Indexed DB to store binary, XML or JSON data	Yes, via Local Shared Objects to store AMF-formatted data
Metadata	Meta tags	Can be included in meta tags	Extensible Metadata Platform

== Comparison ==
=== Software support ===
==== Flash ====
Originally, web browsers could not render Flash media themselves, and required the proprietary freeware plugin Adobe Flash Player. Until 2008, there was no official specification by which to create an alternative player. Alternative players were developed before 2008, but they provided more limited Flash support than the official player. Flash support was built into Google Chrome, Internet Explorer 10 (and later), and Microsoft Edge.

The last version of the Adobe Flash Player ran on Microsoft Windows, Apple macOS, RIM, QNX and Google TV.

Earlier versions ran on Android 2.2-4.0.x (Flash was released for 4.0, but Adobe discontinued support for Android 4.1 and higher.) (Flash 11.2), Linux (Flash 11.2, except for Pepper Flash which is maintained and distributed by Google, not Adobe), PlayStation 3 (Flash 9), and PlayStation Portable (Flash 6). Adobe Flash Lite ran on Wii, Symbian, Maemo Linux, Windows Mobile, and Chumby.

Apple never allowed Flash to run on iOS, the operating system which runs on iPad, iPhone, iPod Touch and Apple TV. Apple officially dropped support for Adobe Flash from the macOS version of Safari 14 released on September 17, 2020 for macOS 10.14 Mojave & macOS 10.15 Catalina.

In February 2012, Adobe announced it would discontinue development of Flash Player on Linux for all browsers, except Google Chrome, by dropping support for NPAPI and using only Chrome's PPAPI. In August 2016, Adobe announced that, beginning with version 24, it would resume offering of Flash Player for Linux for other browsers. Adobe stopped traditional support for the Flash platform in 2020 and both Firefox and Google Chrome phased out support of Flash.

==== HTML5 ====
Almost all web browsers support HTML and other Web standards to various degree. Adobe released a tool that converts Flash to HTML5, and in June 2011, Google released an experimental tool that does the same.

As of December 2013, versions of browsers such as Chrome, Firefox, Internet Explorer, Opera, and Safari implement HTML5 to a considerable degree. However, some portions of the HTML5 specification were still being implemented by browser makers.

As of January 2015, YouTube defaults to HTML5 players to better support more devices. HTML5 needs less processing power making it run faster on all browsers. The multimedia integration with HTML5 is quite easy and creates better support for live video streaming on mobile devices also.

=== Vendor neutrality ===
Until 2008, the use of Flash was covered by restrictive licenses. The conditions prohibited use of the specification to develop any software (including players) which could render or read (and thus convert) SWF files, and required the output SWF files to be compatible with Adobe's players.

In 2008, restrictions on use of the SWF and FLV/F4V specifications were dropped, and some specifications were released. However, the "SWF File Format Specification Version 10" allegedly did not contain all the needed information, did not contain much information that hadn't been previously known by the community, and itself could not be copied, printed out in more than one copy, distributed, resold or translated, without written approval of Adobe Systems Incorporated.

Flash was not an open standard. It was controlled by one firm, Adobe Systems. In contrast, HTML5 is controlled mostly by a committee, the Web Hypertext Application Technology Working Group (WHATWG).

Various people have praised Flash over the years for rendering consistently across platforms. Constructing sites in Flash was a way to prevent code forking, whereby different versions of a site are created for different browsers.

Speaking at 'Adobe Max' in 2011, Itai Asseo likewise said that, unlike HTML5, Flash offers a way to develop applications that work across platforms. HTML5, he said, is currently implemented differently (if at all) by different browsers. Although the Flash browser plugin is not supported on the Apple iPhone OS, Flash applications can be exported to Adobe AIR, which runs on that operating system as a native application. In the same talk, Mr. Asseo lamented the return to another browser war (as seen in the late 1990s). If Flash falls out of favor, he said, web developers will either have to develop many different versions of their web sites and native applications to take into account different HTML5 implementations, deny access to browsers that do not support their version of HTML, or dramatically reduce the functionality of their sites in order to deliver content to the least-advanced browser.

=== Authoring ===
Constructing Flash websites using Adobe tools is relatively easier than with integrated development environments for CSS, HTML, and JavaScript; however, many of Adobe's tools are expensive and proprietary software.

In 2011 Adobe released a Flash-to-HTML5 conversion tool for existing content

Because HTML5 is an open format, tools like those for Flash can be built for it, too. Applications like Hype and Adobe Edge are already on the market.

=== Performance ===
Flash had a better performance than HTML according to a comparison of Flash with HTML in 2010 which listed Flash as being faster than the other technologies, when used for non-video animations, although they are catching up.

Some users, more so those on macOS and Linux, complained about the relatively high CPU usage of Flash for video playback. This was partially because the Flash plugin did not use the GPU to render video. Adobe has responded to some of those criticisms in the 10.1 and 10.2 releases of the Flash plugin by offloading H.264 video decoding to dedicated hardware and by introducing a new video API called Stage Video. The use of the newer ActionScript 3.0 inside Flash movies instead of the older ActionScript 2.0 improves code execution speed by a factor of around 10. The software routines written by developers can also affect the performance of applications built in Flash, reasons that would affect HTML5 animations as well.

=== DRM ===
Flash included DRM support. The main HTML 5 standard does not include any digital rights management functionality directly, instead the Encrypted Media Extensions (EME) specification describes application interface (API) for communication channel between web browsers and digital rights management (DRM) agent software.

Historically, before EME introduction implementations could support DRM, for example in codecs. The proposal to add DRM features to HTML5 itself has been criticized by those who consider openness and vendor-neutrality (both server- and client-side) one of the most important properties of HTML, because DRM is incompatible with free software, and in the proposed form potentially not more vendor-neutral than proprietary plug-ins like Flash.

=== Accessibility ===
Both Flash and HTML text can be read by screen readers. However, special care must be taken to ensure Flash movies are read correctly. For example, if a Flash movie is set to repeat indefinitely, this can cause a screen reader to repeat the content endlessly. Selecting the "Make object accessible" check box in Adobe Flash Professional would create a text-only version of the object for screen readers and hide any motion from the screen reader. Since Flash content was usually placed on a single webpage, it appeared as a single entry in search engine result pages, unless developers utilized deep linking to provide multiple links within Flash websites and web applications. User interface widgets in Flash objects would not always behave like their host native counterparts. Keyboard, mouse and other accessibility shortcuts may not have worked unless the webpage developer explicitly added support for it.

=== Search engines ===
Both Flash content and HTML content could be indexed by Google, Yahoo!, and Bing, although bi-directional text (e.g. Arabic, Hebrew) is not supported by Google. Yahoo! added support for indexing Flash sites in 2008, although Google had been able to index them for several years before that. Bing added support for Flash sites in 2010.

=== iOS devices ===
Apple promoted HTML5 as an alternative to Flash for video and other content on the iOS, citing performance and security reasons for not allowing Adobe Flash Player to be installed on iOS devices, including the iPhone, iPod Touch and iPad. Flash applications could be packaged as native iOS applications via the Adobe Integrated Runtime and the iOS Packager.

== See also ==
- Comparison of vector graphics editors
- CSS animations
- Flash animation
- HTML5test
- Security of Adobe Flash
- SVG animation
- Synchronized Multimedia Integration Language
