= Web platform =

Browser-based computing platform

The Web platform is a collection of technologies developed as open standards by the World Wide Web Consortium and other standardization bodies such as the Web Hypertext Application Technology Working Group, the Unicode Consortium, the Internet Engineering Task Force, and Ecma International. It is the umbrella term introduced by the World Wide Web Consortium, and in 2011 it was defined as "a platform for innovation, consolidation and cost efficiencies" by W3C CEO Jeff Jaffe. Being built on The evergreen Web (where rapid, automatic software updates, vendor co-operation, standardization, and competition take place) has allowed for the addition of new capabilities while addressing security and privacy risks. Additionally, developers are enabled to build interoperable content on a cohesive platform.

The Web platform includes technologies—computer languages and APIs—that were originally created in relation to the publication of Web pages. This includes HTML, CSS, SVG, MathML, WAI-ARIA, ECMAScript, WebGL, Web Storage, Indexed Database API, Web Components, WebAssembly, WebGPU, Web Workers, WebSocket, Geolocation API, Server-Sent Events, DOM Events, Media Fragments, XMLHttpRequest, Cross-Origin Resource Sharing, File API, RDFa, WOFF, HTTP, TLS 1.2, and IRI.

== Platforms ==
=== HTML ===
Hypertext Markup Language (HTML) is the standard markup language (Note: Even though HTML code can be executed in a browser, it is not viewed as a programming language in programming language discourse.) for documents designed to be displayed in a web browser. It defines the content and structure of web content. It is often assisted by technologies such as Cascading Style Sheets (CSS) and scripting languages such as JavaScript.

Web browsers receive HTML documents from a web server or from local storage and render the documents into multimedia web pages. HTML describes the structure of a web page semantically and originally included cues for its appearance.

HTML elements are the building blocks of HTML pages. With HTML constructs, images and other objects such as interactive forms may be embedded into the rendered page. HTML provides a means to create structured documents by denoting structural semantics for text such as headings, paragraphs, lists, links, quotes, and other items. HTML elements are delineated by tags, written using angle brackets. Tags such as <img> and <input> directly introduce content into the page. Other tags such as <p> and its corresponding closing tag </p> surround and provide information about document text and may include sub-element tags. Browsers do not display the HTML tags, but use them to interpret the content of the page.

HTML can embed programs written in a scripting language such as JavaScript, which affects the behavior and content of web pages. The inclusion of CSS defines the look and layout of content. The World Wide Web Consortium (W3C), former maintainer of the HTML and current maintainer of the CSS standards, has encouraged the use of CSS over explicit presentational HTML since 1997.

=== CSS ===
Cascading Style Sheets (CSS) is a simple mechanism for adding style (e.g., fonts, colors, spacing) to Web documents.

=== Scalable Vector Graphics ===
Scalable Vector Graphics (SVG) is an XML-based vector graphics format for defining two-dimensional graphics, having support for interactivity and animation. The SVG specification is an open standard developed by the World Wide Web Consortium since 1999.

SVG images are defined in a vector graphics format and stored in XML text files. SVG images can thus be scaled in size without loss of quality, and SVG files can be searched, indexed, scripted, and compressed. The XML text files can be created and edited with text editors or vector graphics editors, and are rendered by most web browsers. SVG can include JavaScript, potentially leading to cross-site scripting.

== See also ==
- Open Web Foundation (OWF)
- Responsive web design (RWD)
- Web standards
- WebPlatform.org
