= Mobify =

Canadian software company

- Type: Subsidiary
- Industry: Technology
- Founded: 2007; 19 years ago
- Headquarters: Vancouver, British Columbia, Canada
- Number of employees: 49
- Parent: Salesforce
- Website: mobify.com

Mobify, a Salesforce company, provides Front-end Services, such as creating customized apps and e-commerce sites. The technology company is based in Vancouver, British Columbia, Canada, and has a global network of customers and partners.

== Acquisitions ==
In September 2020, Mobify was acquired by Salesforce, a prominent provider of customer relationship management (CRM) services worldwide, for $60 million.

== Company history ==
In 2007, Igor Faletski, John Boxall, and PJ McLachlan co-founded the company. Faletski and Boxall met while attending Simon Fraser University in Vancouver, British Columbia, Canada. After experiencing the inconvenience of missing their bus, they came up with the idea of using mobile devices to solve the problem. PJ joined the team after Faletski and Boxall discovered his transWidget project; a Mac OS X dashboard widget for displaying upcoming bus times from TransLink. Together, they developed a system that could deliver bus schedules to mobile devices through SMS text messaging. Following local media attention, they started their own company in Faletski's mother's basement and licensed the system to TransLink.

As the company pursued further business development, it became clear that the original product was not scalable. This realization prompted a change in direction, and the company shifted its focus to developing a new system that helps enterprise websites create adaptive mobile websites.

As of 2013, Mobify boasted more than 90,000 users across over 200 countries, with major clients including Starbucks, Bosch, and Toyota. In early 2015, Google's announcement of support for Progressive Web Applications (PWAs) led Mobify to launch its first PWA, which it did in collaboration with PureFormulas. Following its successful collaboration with British multinational retailer Debenhams on their PWA, Mobify launched its first desktop PWA, which paved the way for its current offering, the Front-end Platform as a Service for headless commerce architectures. In 2020, Salesforce acquired Mobify.
