= Web SQL Database =

Deprecated Web browser API

Web SQL Database was a web browser API specification for storing data in databases that can be queried using SQL variant. Introduced in 2010 and quickly deprecated in favor of Web Storage API and IndexedDB, WebSQL was removed from browsers by April 2024. The technology was only ever implemented in Blink-based browsers like Google Chrome and the new Microsoft Edge, and WebKit-based browsers like Safari.

== Support ==
The API was supported by Google Chrome, Opera, Microsoft Edge, and the Android Browser. Web SQL was deprecated and removed for third-party contexts in Chromium 97. Web SQL access in insecure contexts is deprecated as of Chrome/Chromium 105 at which time a warning message was shown in the Chrome DevTools Issue panel. The API was entirely removed from Chrome 124.

== Timeline ==
In January 2010, Google announced availability of WebSQL Database API in Google Chrome.

Mozilla Corporation developers publicly opposed the technology and at the same were the main proponents behind an 'alternative storage' standard, IndexedDB. Mozilla argued that ratification of WebSQL as a standard would codify the quirks of SQLite implementation.

In November 2010, the W3C Web Applications Working Group ceased working on the specification, citing a lack of independent implementations (i.e. using database system other than SQLite as the backend) as the reason the specification could not move forward to become a W3C Recommendation.

In September 2019, Apple released Safari 13 which removed WebSQL entirely.

In November 2021, Chrome 97 removed WebSQL support in third-party contexts.

In February 2023, Chrome 110 removed WebSQL support in insecure contexts but allowed exceptions set with an enterprise policy.

In October 2023, Chrome 119 was shipped with WebSQL disabled in all contexts by default, with an ability to re-enable it until Chrome 123 via a deprecation trial in some contexts.

In April 2024, Chromium-based browsers, including Chrome 124 and Edge 124 have removed support WebSQL completely. Android WebView 133 removed WebSQL was the last Chromium-based browser to support WebSQL.

== See also ==
- HTML5
- Indexed Database API
- Web Storage
