= HTML5 File API =

File API
- Status: W3C Working Draft
- Year started: 18 October 2006
- First published: 18 October 2006
- Organization: W3C
- Committee: Web Applications Working Group (WAWG)
- Editors: Marijn Kruisselbrink; Arun Ranganathan
- Base standards: HTML DOM; Encoding Standard; Fetch Standard; Streams Standard; URL Standard; data URI scheme; XHR
- Related standards: Web Workers
- Domain: File system
- Website: www.w3.org/TR/FileAPI/

HTML5 File API aspect provides an API for representing file objects in web applications and programmatic selection and accessing their data. In addition, this specification defines objects to be used within threaded web applications for the synchronous reading of files. The File API describes how interactions with files are handled, for reading information about them and their data as well, to be able to upload it. Despite the name, the File API is not part of HTML5.

== See also ==
- File select
- HTML5
- W3C Geolocation API
- Binary Large Object
