= InternetUrok =

Russian online education platform

- Website type: distance learning platform
- Available in: ru
- Country of origin: Russia
- Founder: Mihail Lazarev
- Website: interneturok.ru
- Commercial: No
- Users: 2.2 million
- Launched: 1 September 2009; 17 years ago
- Current status: Active

InternetUrok (Russian: ИнтернетУрок) is educational online platform headquartered in Moscow, Russia. The platform includes an online library for schoolkids, their parents and teachers and a private online school from grades 1 to 11. The platform was founded by Mihail Lazarev in 2009.

== Description ==
In 2020, the library contained over 4,700 school lessons which include animations, illustrations, links to external sources, synopses and interactive tests for self-examination. The service provides feedback to learners who can ask their questions the teachers and get quick responses. The materials are constantly updated and replenished, the site is free of advertising. Most of the materials on the portal are in the public domain.

InternetUrok Home School is a fully online private school offering Russian secondary education for students all over the world since 2014. There are three study formats to choose from:

- Solo — students have access to the library, the curriculum and video consultations. For those who wish to deepen their knowledge on some subjects while attending the traditional school and those who missed or didn’t understand the topic at their public school.
- With teachers — students complete homework which is then checked and graded by teachers. For those who wish to learn additionally to the traditional school instead of receiving assistance from tutors and those who wish to switch to homeschooling.
- With enrollment – students are enrolled to partner schools and are able to get school certificate upon graduation.

Since 2017, students and their parents may get assistance in solving educational and administrative issues from personal mentors.

=== Indicators ===
Number of students at the end of the academic year:

- Spring 2017: 900 students.
- Spring 2018: 3100 students.
- Spring 2019: 7000 students.
- Spring 2020: 14,000 students.

The COVID-19 pandemic has led to the transition of the vast majority of schools in Russia to distance learning, which has led to a significant increase in users of the InternetUrok portal.

=== Geography of users ===
- 2015—2016: students from 26 countries of the world, including the United States of America, Canada, Kazakhstan, Turkey, Cambodia, Colombia, Spain, France, Israel, South Africa, Japan and others.
- 2017—2018: students from 63 countries. The top-10 countries with the largest number of students included Russia, Kazakhstan, Turkey, USA, United Arab Emirates, China, Thailand, South Korea, Israel and Canada.
- 2018: students from 82 countries.
- 2019—2020: over 90 countries.

InternetUrok Home School is popular in Kazakhstan where it is legally impossible to switch to homeschooling but Russian school certificates are equally acknowledged as well as Kazakh ones.

=== Founder of the InternetUrok ===
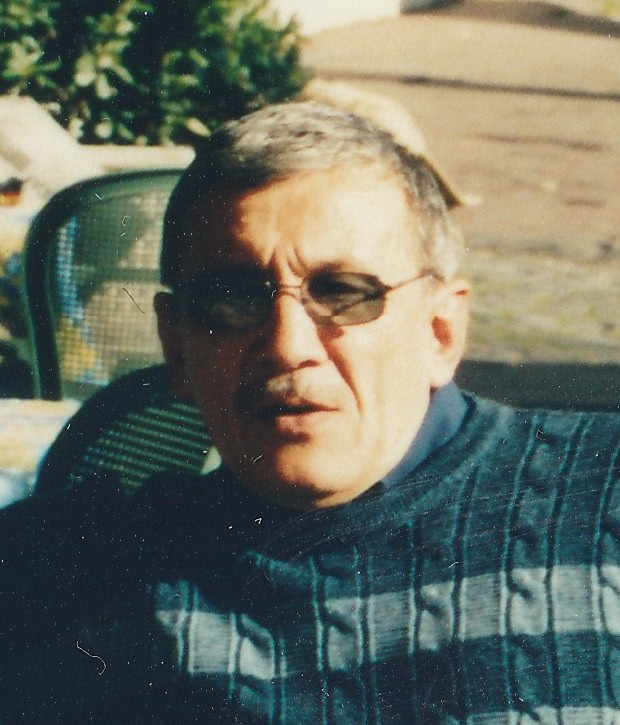
Mikhail Lazarev (2000)

Mihail Lazarev (1946—2021) is entrepreneur, inventor, investor, founder of the educational project InternetUrok and the brand of vitamins «Alphabet».

Studied at the Moscow Institute of Physics and Technology at the Faculty of Aerophysics and Space Research (1964—1970). Candidate of Physical and Mathematical Sciences. Author of scientific papers and patented inventions. Engaged in entrepreneurship in the field of high technologies (since 1989). In 2002 he founded the pharmaceutical company «Aquion». Co-author of patents, on the basis of which the preparations «Alphabet» and «Kudesan» were created.

== Bibliography ==
- Lazarev, Mikhail (6 September 2020). "Today machines can also know and be able. Children need to be taught to understand". RBK+ (in Russian). 13.
- Tsareva, Marina (2020). "KPI on the couch". Kommersant (in Russian).
