= Safari (web browser) =

Web browser by Apple

- Safari 26 running on macOS Tahoe, showing the home page of Wikipedia
- Developer: Apple
- Release: January 7, 2003; 23 years ago

Preview release(s)
- macOS: Technology Preview 235 / 14 January 2026
- Written in: C++; C; assembly language; Objective-C; JavaScript
- Engines: WebKit; JavaScriptCore
- Operating system: macOS; iOS; iPadOS; Windows (2007–2012); visionOS
- Included with: macOS; iOS; iPadOS; visionOS
- Type: Web browser
- License: Freeware (pre-installed on Apple devices); some components GNU LGPL (Note: For example, the rendering engine is under the GNU Lesser General Public License.)
- Website: apple.com/safari

Safari is a web browser developed by Apple. It is built into several of Apple's operating systems, including macOS, iOS, iPadOS, and visionOS, and uses Apple's open-source browser engine WebKit, which was derived from KHTML. It is the second most-used browser in the world, after Google Chrome.

Safari was introduced in an update to Mac OS X Jaguar in January 2003 and made the default web browser with the release of Mac OS X Panther that same year, replacing Internet Explorer for Mac. It has been included with the iPhone since the first-generation iPhone in 2007. At that time, Safari was the fastest browser on the Mac. Between 2007 and 2012, Apple maintained a Windows version, but abandoned it due to low market share. In 2010, Safari 5 introduced a reader mode, extensions, and developer tools. Safari 11, released in 2017, added Intelligent Tracking Prevention, which uses artificial intelligence to block web tracking. Safari 13 added support for Apple Pay and authentication with FIDO2 security keys. Its user interface was redesigned in Safari 15, Safari 18, and Safari 26.

== History and development ==
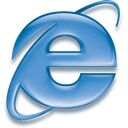
Netscape Navigator and Internet Explorer for Mac were two predecessors of Safari.

=== Background ===
Netscape Navigator rapidly became the dominant Mac browser after its 1994 release, and eventually came bundled with Mac OS. In 1996, Microsoft released Internet Explorer for Mac (IE), and Apple released the Cyberdog internet suite, which included a web browser. In 1997, Apple shelved Cyberdog and reached a five-year agreement with Microsoft to make IE the default browser on the Mac, starting with Mac OS 8.1. Netscape continued to be preinstalled on all Macintosh systems. Microsoft continued to update IE for Mac, which was ported to Mac OS X DP4 in May 2000.

=== Conception ===
Apple introduced the Safari web browser on January 7, 2003. At the time, Steve Jobs called Safari "a turbo browser for Mac OS X". Apple created Safari for speed, calling it the fastest browser for the Mac. Jobs compared it with Internet Explorer, Netscape, and Chimera (later renamed Camino), and demonstrated that Safari's speed was faster. The second reason that Apple created Safari was to innovate; Apple wanted to make a browser better than their competitors. During development, several codenames were used, including "Freedom", "iBrowse", and "Alexander" (a reference to conqueror Alexander the Great, an homage to the Konqueror web browser).

=== Safari 1 ===
On January 7, 2003, at Macworld San Francisco, Apple CEO Steve Jobs announced Safari that was based on WebKit, the company's internal fork of the KHTML browser engine. Apple released the first beta version exclusively on Mac OS X the same day. After that date, several official and unofficial beta versions followed until version 1.0 was released on June 23, 2003. On Mac OS X v10.3, Safari was pre-installed as the system's default browser, rather than requiring a manual download, as was the case with the previous Mac OS X versions. Safari's predecessor, the Internet Explorer for Mac, was then included in 10.3 as an alternative.

=== Safari 2 ===
In April 2005, Engineer Dave Hyatt fixed several bugs in Safari. His experimental beta passed the Acid2 rendering test on April 27, 2005, marking it the first browser to do so. Safari 2.0 which was released on April 29, 2005, was the sole browser Mac OS X 10.4 offered by default. Apple touted this version as it was capable of running a 1.8x speed boost compared to version 1.2.4, but it did not yet feature the Acid2 bug fixes. These major changes were initially unavailable for end-users unless they privately installed and compiled the WebKit source code or ran one of the nightly automated builds available at OpenDarwin. Version 2.0.2, released on October 31, 2005, finally included the Acid2 bug fixes.

In June 2005, in response to KHTML criticisms over the lack of access to change logs, Apple moved the development source code and bug tracking of WebCore and JavaScriptCore to OpenDarwin. They have also open-sourced WebKit. The source code is for non-renderer aspects of the browser, such as its GUI elements and the remaining proprietary. The final stable version of Safari 2 and the last version released exclusively with Mac OS X, Safari 2.0.4, was updated on January 10, 2006, for Mac OS X. It was only available within Mac OS X Update 10.4.4, and it delivered fixes to layout and CPU usage issues among other improvements.

=== Safari 3 ===
On January 9, 2007, at Macworld San Francisco, Jobs unveiled that Safari 3 was ported to the newly introduced iPhone within iPhone OS (later called iOS). The mobile version was capable of displaying full, desktop-class websites. At WWDC 2007, Jobs announced Safari 3 for Mac OS X 10.5, Windows XP, and Windows Vista. He ran a benchmark based on the iBench browser test suite comparing the most popular Windows browsers, and claimed that Safari had the fastest performance. His claim was later examined by a third-party site called Web Performance over HTTP load times. They verified that Safari 3 was indeed the fastest browser on the Windows platform in terms of initial data loading over the Internet, though it was only negligibly faster than Internet Explorer 7 and Mozilla Firefox when it came to static content from the local cache.

The initial Safari 3 beta version for Windows, released on the same day as its announcement at WWDC 2007, contained several bugs and a zero day exploit that allowed remote code executions. The issues were then fixed by Apple three days later on June 14, 2007, in version 3.0.1. On June 22, 2007, Apple released Safari 3.0.2 to address some bugs, performance problems, and other security issues. Safari 3.0.2 for Windows handled some fonts that were missing in the browser but already installed on Windows computers, such as Tahoma, Trebuchet MS, and others. The iPhone was previously released on June 29, 2007, with a version of Safari based on the same WebKit rendering engine as the desktop version but with a modified feature set better suited for a mobile device. The version number of Safari as reported in its user agent string is 3.0 was in line along with the contemporary desktop editions.

The first stable, non-beta version of Safari for Windows, Safari 3.1, was offered as a free download on March 18, 2008. In June 2008, Apple released version 3.1.2, which addressed a security vulnerability in the Windows version where visiting a malicious web site could force a download of executable files and execute them on the user's desktop. Safari 3.2, released on November 13, 2008, introduced anti-phishing features using Google Safe Browsing and Extended Validation Certificate support. The final version of Safari 3 was version 3.2.3, which was released on May 12, 2009, with security improvements.

=== Safari 4 ===
Safari 4 was released on June 8, 2009. It was the first version that had completely passed the Acid3 rendering test, as well as the first version to support HTML5. It incorporated WebKit JavaScript engine SquirrelFish that significantly enhanced the browser's script interpretation performances by 29.9x. SquirrelFish was later evolved to SquirrelFish Extreme, later also marketed as Nitro, which had 63.6x faster performance. A public beta of Safari 4 was experimented on February 24, 2009.

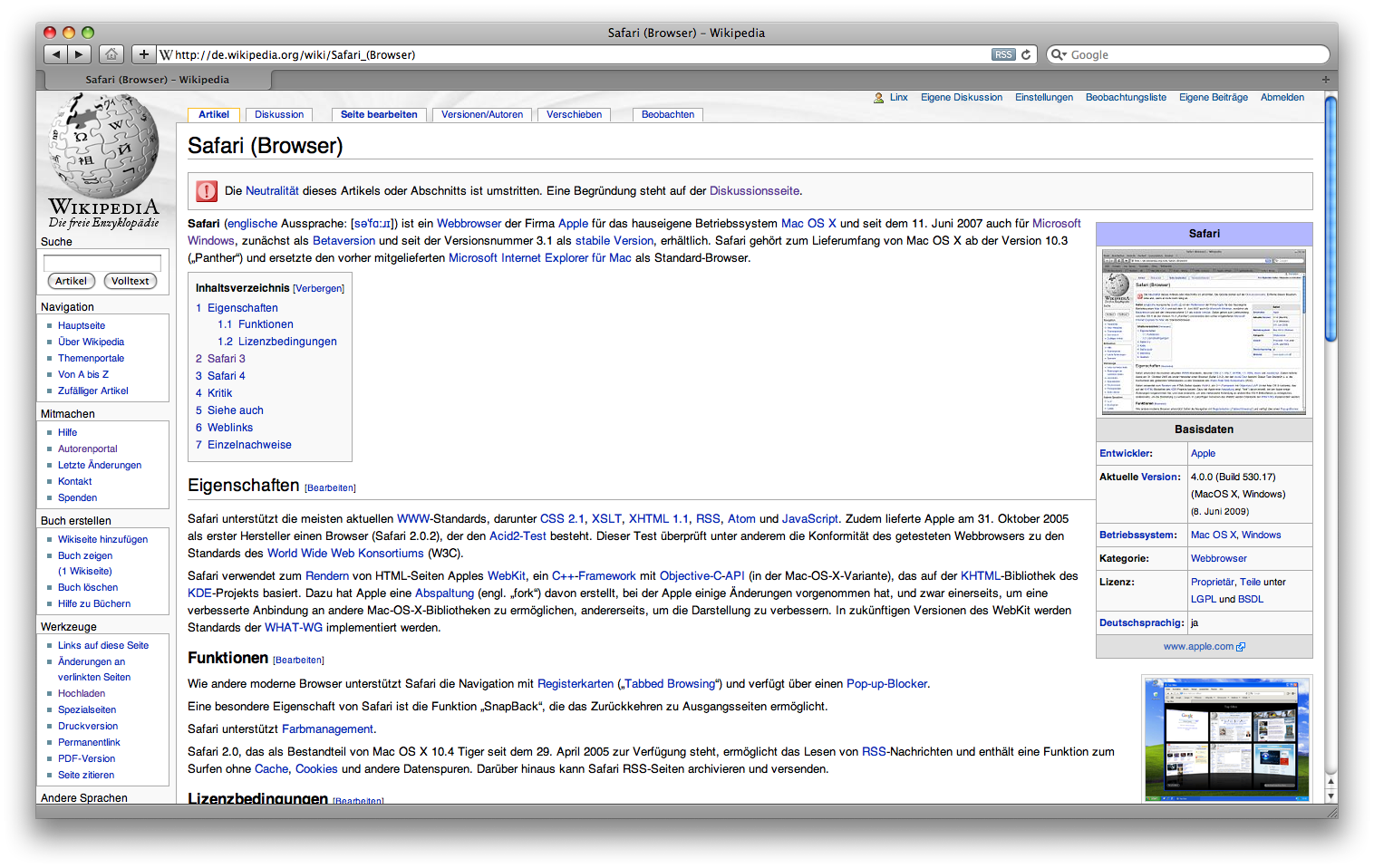
Safari 4 was the first version that had entirely passed the Acid3 rendering test.

Safari 4 relied on Cover Flow to run the History and Bookmarks, and it featured Speculative Loading that automatically pre-loaded document information that is required to visit a particular website. The top sites can be displayed up to 24 thumbnails based on the frequently visited sites in a startup. The desktop version of Safari 4 included a redesign similar to that of the iPhone. The update also commissioned many developer tool improvements, including Web Inspectors, CSS element viewings, JavaScript debuggers and profilers, offline tables, database management, SQL support, and resource graphs. In addition to CSS retouching effects, CSS canvas, and HTML5 content. It replaced the initial Mac OS X-like interface with native Windows themes on Windows, using native font renderings.

Safari 4.0.1 was released for Mac on June 17, 2009, and fixed Faces bugs in iPhoto '09. Safari 4 in Mac OS X v10.6 "Snow Leopard" has built-in 64-bit support, which makes JavaScript load up to 50% faster. It also has native crash resistances that would maintain it intact if a plugin like Flash player crashes, though other tabs or windows would not be affected. Safari 4.0.4, the final version which was released on November 11, 2009, for both Mac and Windows, which further improved the JavaScript performances.

=== Safari 5 ===
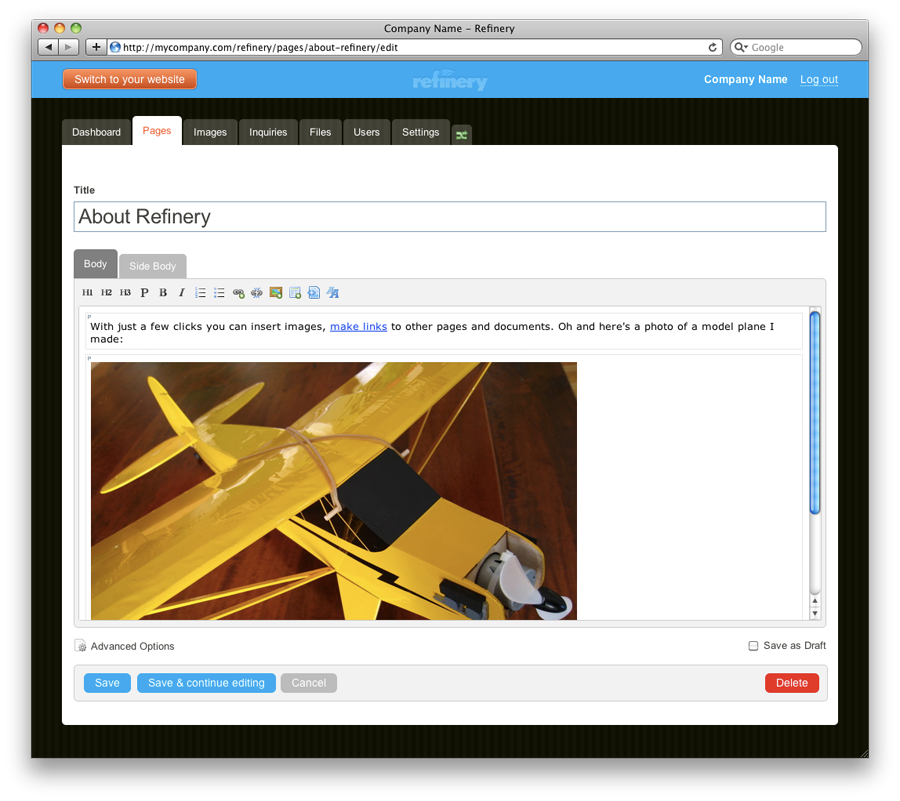
Safari 5 was the final supported version for Windows.

Safari 5 was released on June 7, 2010, and featured a less distracting reader view, and had a 30x faster JavaScript performances. It incorporated numerous developer tool improvements, including HTML5 interoperability and accessibility to secure extensions. The progress bar was re-added in this version as well. Safari 5.0.1 enabled the Extensions PrefPane by default, rather than requiring users to manually set it in the Debug menu.

Version 5.1.7 was the final version for Windows. While no longer available from Apple, this release can still be downloaded from the Wayback Machine and is still functional on Windows 11.

Apple exclusively released Safari 4.1 concurrently with Safari 5 for Mac OS X Tiger. It included many features that were found in Safari 5, though it excluded the Safari Reader and Safari Extensions. Apple released Safari 5.1 for both Windows and Mac on July 20, 2011, for Mac OS X 10.7 Lion; it was faster than Safari 5.0, and included the new Reading List feature. The company simultaneously announced Safari 5.0.6 in late June 2010 for Mac OS X 10.5 Leopard, though the new functions were excluded from Leopard users.

Several HTML5 features were provided in Safari 5. It added supports for full-screen video, closed caption, geolocation, EventSource, and a now obsolete early variant of the WebSocket protocol. The fifth major version of Safari added supports for Full-text search, and a new search engine, Bing. Safari 5 supported Reader, which displays web pages in a continuous view, without advertisements. Safari 5 supported a smarter address field and DNS prefetching that automatically found links and looked up addresses on the web. New web pages loaded faster using Domain Name System (DNS) prefetching. The Windows version received an extra update on graphics acceleration as well. The blue inline progress bar was returned to the address bar, in addition to the spinning bezel and loading indicator introduced in Safari 4. Top Sites view now has a button to switch to Full History Search. Other features included Extension Builder for developers of Safari Extensions. Other changes included an improved inspector. Safari 5 supports Extensions, add-ons that customize the web browsing experience. Extensions are built using web standards such as HTML5, CSS3, and JavaScript.

=== Safari 6 ===
Safari 6.0 was previously referred to as Safari 5.2 until Apple changed the version number at WWDC 2012. The stable release of Safari 6 coincided with the release of OS X Mountain Lion on July 25, 2012, and was integrated within OS. As a result, it was no longer available for download from Apple's website or any other sources. Apple released Safari 6 via Software Update for users of OS X Lion. It was not released for OS X versions before Lion or for Windows. The company later quietly removed references and links for the Windows version of Safari 5. Microsoft had also removed Safari from its browser-choice page.

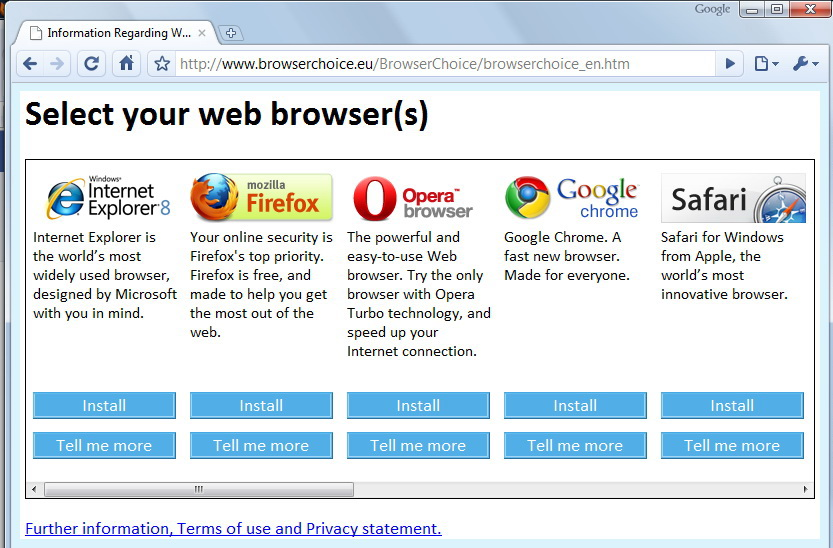
Safari 6 ceased support for Windows users, and it was subsequently removed from Microsoft's browser-choice menu.

On June 11, 2012, Apple released a developer preview of Safari 6.0 with a feature called iCloud Tabs, which syncs with open tabs on any iOS or other OS X device that runs the latest software. It updated new privacy features, including an "Ask websites not to track me" preference and the ability for websites to send OS X 10.8 Mountain Lion users notifications, though it removed RSS support. Safari 6 had the Share Sheets capability in OS X Mountain Lion. The Share Sheet options were: Add to Reading List, Add Bookmark, Email this Page, Message, Twitter, and Facebook. Tabs with full-page previews were added, too. The sixth major version of Safari, it added options to allow pages to be shared with other users via email, Messages, Twitter, and Facebook, as well as making some minor performance improvements. It added supports for -webkit-calc() in CSS. Additionally, various features were removed, including Activity Window, a separate Download Window, direct support for RSS feeds in the URL field, and bookmarks. The separate search field and the address bar were also no longer available as a toolbar configuration option. Instead, it was replaced by the smart search field, a combination of the address bar and the search field.

=== Safari 7 ===
Craig Federighi announcing Safari 7 (pictured in projection screen) in WWDC 2013

Safari 7 was announced at WWDC 2013, and it brought a number of JavaScript performance improvements. It made use of Top Site and Sidebar, Shared Links, and Power Saver, which paused unused plugins. Safari 7 for OS X Mavericks and Safari 6.1 for Lion and Mountain Lion were all released along with OS X Mavericks in the special event on October 22, 2013.

=== Safari 8 ===
Safari 8 was announced at WWDC 2014 and was released for OS X Yosemite. It included the JavaScript API WebGL, stronger privacy management, improved iCloud integration, and a redesigned interface. It was also faster and more efficient, with additional developer features including JavaScript Promises, CSS Shapes & Composting mark up, IndexedDB, Encrypted Media Extensions, and SPDY protocol.

=== Safari 9 ===
Safari 9 was announced in WWDC 2015 and was shipped with OS X El Capitan. New features included audio muting, more options for Safari Reader, and improved autofill. It was not fully available for the previous OS X Yosemite.

=== Safari 10 ===
Safari 10 allowed extensions to be saved directly to Pocket and Dic Go.

Safari 10 was shipped with macOS Sierra and released for OS X Yosemite and OS X El Capitan on September 20, 2016. It had a redesigned Bookmark and History views, and double-clicking will centralized focus on a particular folder. The update redirected Safari extensions to be saved directly to Pocket and Dic Go. Software improvements included Autofill quality from the Contrast card and Web Inspector Timelines Tab, in-line sub-headlines, bylines, and publish dates. This version tracks and re-applies zoomed level to websites, and legacy plug-ins were disabled by default in favor of HTML5 versions of websites. Recently closed tabs can be reopened via the History menu, or by holding the "+" button in the tab bar, and using Shift-Command-T. When a link opens in a new tab; it is now possible to hit the back button or swipe to close it and go back to the original tab. Debugging is now supported on the Web Inspector. Safari 10 also includes several security updates, including fixes for six WebKit vulnerabilities and issues related to Reader and Tabs. The first version of Safari 10 was released on September 20, 2016, and the last version (10.1.2) was released on July 19, 2017.

=== Safari 11 ===
Safari 11 was released on September 19, 2017, for OS X El Capitan and macOS Sierra, ahead of macOS High Sierra's release. It was included with High Sierra. Safari 11 included several new features such as Intelligent Tracking Prevention which aimed to prevent cross-site tracking by placing limitations on cookies and other website data. Intelligent Tracking Prevention allowed first-party cookies to continue track the browser history, though with time limits. For example, first-party cookies from ad-tech companies such as Google/Alphabet Inc., were set to expire in 24-hours after the visit.

=== Safari 12 ===
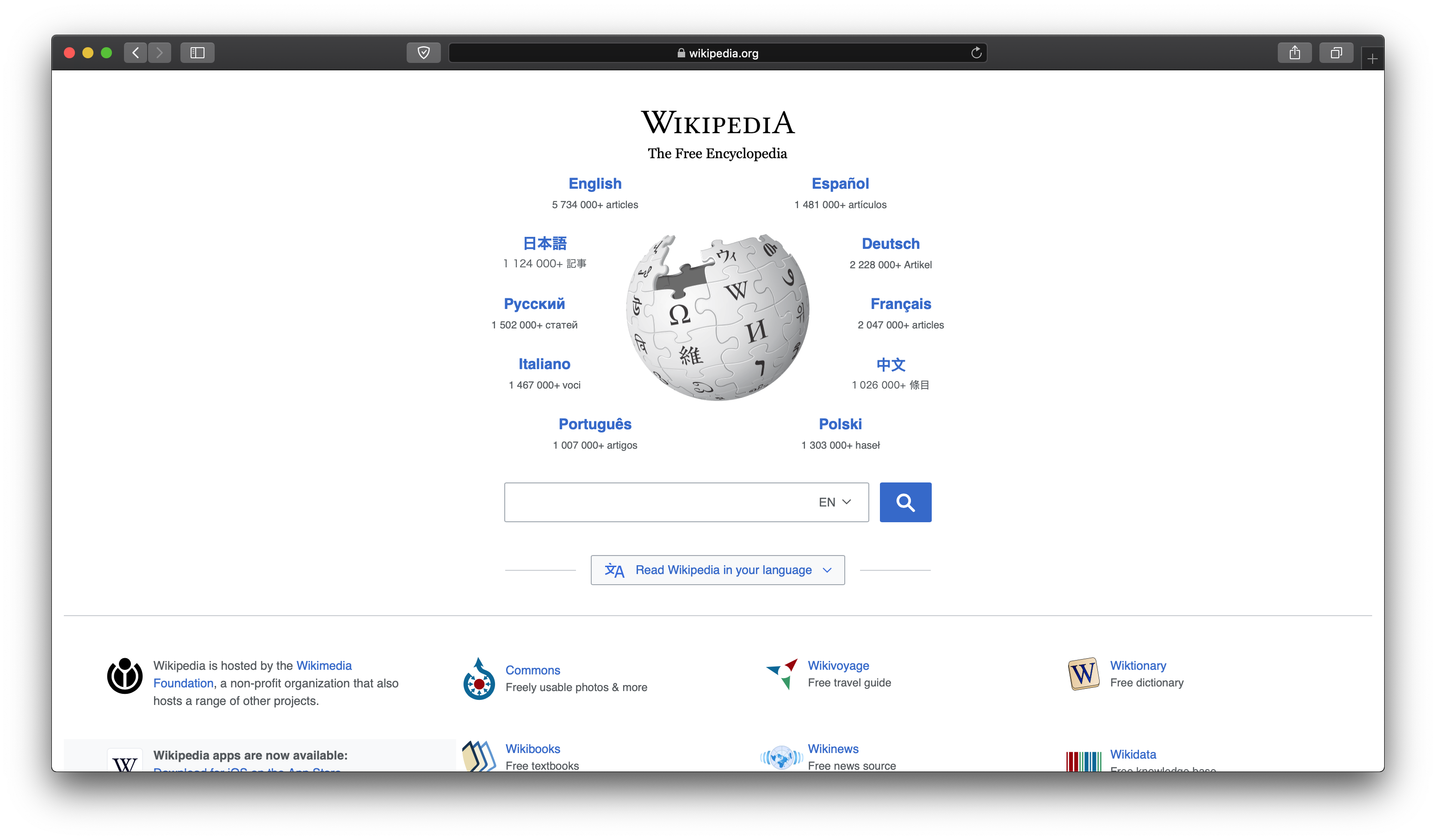
Safari 12 in dark mode

Safari 12 was released for macOS Mojave on September 24, 2018. It was also available to macOS Sierra and macOS High Sierra on September 17, 2018. Safari 12 included several new features such as icons in tabs, automatic strong passwords, and Intelligent Tracking Prevention 2.0. Safari version 12.0.1 was released on October 30, 2018, within macOS Mojave 10.14.1, and Safari 12.0.2 was released on December 5, 2018, under macOS 10.14.2. Support for developer-signed classic Safari Extensions has been dropped. This version would also be the last that supported the official Extensions Gallery. Apple also encouraged extension authors to switch to Safari App Extensions, which triggered negative feedback from the community.

=== Safari 13 ===
Safari 13 was announced at WWDC 2019 on June 3, 2019. Safari 13 included several new features, such as prompting users to change weak passwords, FIDO2 USB security key authentication support, Sign in with Apple support, Apple Pay on the Web support, and increased speed and security. Safari 13 was released on September 20, 2019, on macOS High Sierra and macOS Mojave, and later shipped with macOS Catalina.

=== Safari 14 ===
In June 2020 it was announced that macOS Big Sur will include Safari 14. According to Apple, Safari 14 is more than 50% faster than Google Chrome. Safari 14 introduced new privacy features, including Privacy Report, which shows blocked content and privacy information on web pages. Users will also receive a monthly report on trackers that Safari has blocked. Extensions can also be enabled or disabled on a site-by-site basis. Safari 14 introduced partial support for the WebExtension API used in Google Chrome, Microsoft Edge, Firefox, and Opera, making it easier for developers to port their extensions from those web browsers to Safari. Support for Adobe Flash Player will also be dropped from Safari, 3 months ahead of its end-of-life. A built-in translation service allows translation of a page to another language. Safari 14 was released as a standalone update to macOS Catalina and Mojave users on September 16, 2020. It added Ecosia as a supported search engine.

=== Safari 15 ===
Safari 15 was released for iOS 15, iPadOS 15, macOS Catalina, and macOS Big Sur on September 20, 2021, and later shipped with macOS Monterey. It featured a redesigned interface and tab groups that blended better into the background. There were also a new home page and extension support on the iOS and iPadOS editions. Starting with this update, Safari versions would support iOS and iPadOS, ending the iOS version of separate updates.

=== Safari 16 ===
Safari 16 was released for iOS 16, macOS Big Sur, and macOS Monterey on September 12, 2022, and later shipped with macOS Ventura and iPadOS 16. Safari 16 added support for non-animated AVIF and contains several bug fixes and feature polishing. Safari 16 also includes shared tab groups, vertical tab support, website settings synchronization between devices connected to a same iCloud account, the ability to add backgrounds for a start page, new languages for built-in translation, built-in image translation, and new options to edit strong passwords. iOS 16.4 also introduced Web Push notifications.

=== Safari 17 ===
Safari 17 was released in September 2023 with iOS 17, iPadOS 17, and macOS Sonoma. It includes a feature named "Profiles", which allows users to separate their browsing sessions for different use cases. Every profile has a separate favorites bar, navigation history, extensions, tab groups, and cookies. Just like iOS 16.4, Safari 17 introduces web apps that can be added to the dock. Cookies are copied into web apps so that users stay logged into the web app if they are already in Safari. Safari can also now read pages with a new option in the navigation bar menu.

New privacy features include locked private browsing when not in use, tracking-free URLs, private relay based on the country's location and time, instead of general position.

Safari has also been adapted to Vision Pro with a new spatial UI, and Apple has redesigned the Develop menu for web developers.

Safari 17 added AV1 hardware decoding support for devices with hardware decoding support.

| Version | Build | Release date | Release notes |
|---|---|---|---|
| 17.0 | 616A120a; 616A124a | September 26, 2023 | |
| 17.1 | 616B19; 616B29 | October 25, 2023 | |
| 17.1.1 | 616B34 | November 6, 2023 | |
| 17.1.2 | 616B21; 616B36 | November 30, 2023 | |
| 17.2 | 617C32; 617C33 | December 11, 2023 | |
| 17.2.1 | 617C36; 617C37 | December 19, 2023 | |
| 17.3 | 617D29; 617D37a | January 22, 2024 | |

=== Safari 18 ===
Safari 18 was released in September 2024 with iOS 18, iPadOS 18 and macOS Sequoia, and for the first time, visionOS 2. Like Safari 15, it redesigns the interface, but it is less significant and is mainly applied to the start page and reader mode (which is now called Reader).

A new feature, AI-powered "Highlights," has been introduced, which will automatically detect relevant information on a page and highlight it as you browse.

Other new features include faster loading times and a redesigned unified menu which is now on all versions of the browser; previously, it was exclusive to iOS and iPadOS along with the compact mode on macOS.

| Version | Build | Release date | Release notes |
|---|---|---|---|
| 18.0 | 619A60; 619A63 | September 16, 2024 | |
| 18.0.1 | 619A62a; 619A64a | October 3, 2024 | |
| 18.1 | 619B28; 619B29 | October 29, 2024 | |
| 18.1.1 | 619B32; 619B33 | November 19, 2024 | |
| 18.2 | 620C26; 620C29 | December 11, 2024 | |
| 18.3 beta | 620D9 | December 18, 2024 | |

=== Safari 26 ===
Safari 26 was released in September 2025 with iOS 26, iPadOS 26, macOS Tahoe, and visionOS 26. The browser has been revamped using the Liquid Glass design language and now has an optional compact layout on iOS; the compact layout on iPadOS and macOS had been removed.

In iPadOS and macOS 26.4, the compact layout has been added back.

Like Apple's operating systems, Safari's version number is now based on the calendar year following its initial release.

=== iOS versions ===
Starting with iOS 15 and iPadOS 15, Safari would now ship the same features as the macOS version. This included the name of the updates, ending the separation of the macOS and iOS versions.

| Version | New features |
|---|---|
| iOS-specific features | Bookmarking links to particular pages as "Web Clip" icons on the Home screen.; MDI-style browsing.; Opening specially designed pages in full-screen mode.; Pressing on an image for 3 seconds to save it to the photo album.; Support for HTML5 new input types.; Only the domain name is shown in the address bar, if not focused upon (while not actuated). |
| iOS 4; iOS 4.2 | Find feature built into search box.; Ability to print the current webpage using AirPrint. |
| iOS 4.3 | Integration of the Nitro JavaScript engine for faster page loads. This feature was expanded to home-screen web applications in iOS 5.0. |
| iOS 5 | True tabbed browsing, similar to the desktop experience, only for iPads.; Reading List, a bookmarking feature that allows tagging of certain sites for reading later, which syncs across all Safari browsers (mobile and desktop) via Apple's iCloud service.; Reader, a reading feature that can format text and images from a web page into a more readable format, similar to a PDF document, while stripping out web advertising and superfluous information.; Private browsing, like in most desktop browsers, is a feature that does not save the user's cookies and history or allow anything to be written into local storage or Web SQL Databases. |
| iOS 6 | iCloud Tabs, linking the desktop and iOS versions of Safari.; Offline Reading Lists allow users to read pages stored previously without remaining connected to the internet.; Full-screen landscape view, for iPhone and iPod touch users, hides most of the Safari controls except the back and forward buttons and the status bar when in landscape mode. |
| iOS 7 | New icon; 64-bit build on supported devices using the A7 processor.; iCloud Keychain: iCloud can remember passwords, account names, and credit card numbers. Safari can also autofill them. Requires devices that run iOS 7.0.3 and later and OS X Mavericks or later.; Password generator: When creating a new account, Safari can suggest the user a long, more secure, hard-to-guess password, and Safari will also automatically remember the password.; Shared Links; Do Not Track; Parental controls; Tab limit increased from 9 to 36; New Tab view (iPhone and iPod touch only); Unified smart search field; Syncing bookmarks with Google Chrome and Firefox on Windows. |
| iOS 8 | A search function to search through all open tabs has been added in Tab view on iPad and select iPhones; Two-finger pinch to reveal Tab view on iPads and select iPhones; New Sidebar that slides out to reveal bookmarks, Reading List, and Shared Links on iPads and select iPhones in landscape view; Address bar now hides when scrolling down on iPads; Spotlight Search is now available from Safari's address bar; Option to "Scan Credit Card" when filling out credit card info on a web form; WebGL support; APNG support; Private browsing per tab; RSS feeds in Shared Links; DuckDuckGo support; Option to request the desktop site while entering a web address; Option to add a website to Favorites while entering a web address; Swipe to close iCloud tabs from other devices.; Hold the "+" (new tab button) in tab view to list recently closed tabs is now available on iPhone; Can delete individual items from History; Safari now blocks ads from automatically redirecting to the App Store without user interaction; Bookmark icon updated; Improved, iPad-like interface available on select iPhones in landscape view |
| iOS 9 | The option to add content blocking extensions is available to block specific web content; Apps can use Safari's view controller to display web content from within the app, sharing cookies and other website data with Safari; Improved reader view, allowing the user to choose from different fonts and themes as well as hiding the controls |
| iOS 10 | Apple Pay in Safari; View two pages at once using Split View in Safari on iPad |
| iOS 11 | More rounded search bar; Redesigned video player; Modified scrolling speed and momentum |
| iOS 12 | Support for stronger password suggestion; Support for auto-fill from a third-party provider; A third party can suggest a strong password; Auto-fill of 2FA code sent by email; Fullscreen Support |
| iOS 13 | Desktop browsing mode can be enabled by default; Revamped start page; Website preferences (Privacy, etc.); Page zoom up to 300%; Read view can be enabled by default; Toggle content blockers for all websites; Permission access pop-up, asking for permission to use the camera, audio, and location data; Image resizing; Save open tabs as Bookmarks; Open tabs from search; Automatically close tabs after a set period of time; Redesigned share sheet; Apple ID sign-in to third-party sites; Weak password warning; Improved encryption; Next-level anti-fingerprinting protections; Download manager icon |
| iOS 14 | Faster JavaScript engine support; Built-in translation option; Password monitoring; Password alerts; Privacy and data tracking report; Picture-in-picture mode; Website launch from search; Sign in with Apple ID on many third-party websites; Tracking permission |

=== Safari Technology Preview ===
Safari Technology Preview was first released alongside OS X El Capitan 10.11.4. Safari Technology Preview releases include the latest version of WebKit, which includes Web technologies in the future stable releases of Safari so that developers and users can install the Technology Preview release on a Mac, test those features, and provide feedback.

=== Safari Developer Program ===
The Safari Developer Program was a program dedicated to in-browser extension and HTML developers. It allowed members to write and distribute extensions for Safari through the Safari Extensions Gallery. It was initially free until it was incorporated into the Apple Developer Program in WWDC 2015, which costs $99 a year. The charges prompted frustrations from developers. Within OS X El Capitan, Apple implemented the Secure Extension Distribution to further improve its security, and it automatically updated all extensions within the Safari Extensions Gallery.

=== Version compatibility ===
| Operating system | Operating system version | Latest Safari version | Support |
|---|---|---|---|
| macOS | Mac OS X 10.2 Jaguar | 1.0.3 (August 13, 2004) | 2003–2004 |
| macOS | Mac OS X 10.3 Panther | 1.3.2 (January 11, 2006) | 2003–2006 |
| macOS | Mac OS X 10.4 Tiger | 4.1.3 (November 18, 2010) | 2005–2010 |
| macOS | Mac OS X 10.5 Leopard | 5.0.6 (July 20, 2011) | 2007–2011 |
| macOS | Mac OS X 10.6 Snow Leopard | 5.1.10 (September 12, 2013) | 2009–2013 |
| macOS | Mac OS X 10.7 Lion | 6.1.6 (August 13, 2014) | 2011–2014 |
| macOS | OS X 10.8 Mountain Lion | 6.2.8 (August 13, 2015) | 2012–2015 |
| macOS | OS X 10.9 Mavericks | 9.1.3 (September 1, 2016) | 2013–2016 |
| macOS | OS X 10.10 Yosemite | 10.1.2 (July 19, 2017) | 2014–2017 |
| macOS | OS X 10.11 El Capitan | 11.1.2 (July 9, 2018) | 2015–2018 |
| macOS | macOS 10.12 Sierra | 12.1.2 (July 22, 2019) | 2016–2019 |
| macOS | macOS 10.13 High Sierra | 13.1.2 (July 15, 2020) | 2017–2020 |
| macOS | macOS 10.14 Mojave | 14.1.2 (September 13, 2021) | 2018–2021 |
| macOS | macOS 10.15 Catalina | 15.6.1 (August 18, 2022) | 2019–2022 |
| macOS | macOS 11 Big Sur | 16.6.1 (September 21, 2023) | 2020–2023 |
| macOS | macOS 12 Monterey | 17.6 (June 29, 2024) | 2021–2024 |
| macOS | macOS 13 Ventura | 18.6 (July 30, 2025) | 2022–2025 |
| macOS | macOS 14 Sonoma | 26.6.1 (August 18, 2026) | 2023–2026 |
| macOS | macOS 15 Sequoia | 27.0 (September 14, 2026) | Since 2026 |
| macOS | macOS 26 Tahoe | 27.0 (September 14, 2026) | Since 2026 |
| macOS | macOS 27 Golden Gate | 27.0 (September 14, 2026) | Since 2026 |
| Microsoft Windows | Windows 2000 | 3.1.2 (June 19, 2008) | Unofficial |
| Microsoft Windows | Windows XP RTM, SP1 | 4.0.3 (August 11, 2009) | 2007–2009 |
| Microsoft Windows | Windows XP SP2, SP3 | 5.1.7 (May 9, 2012) | 2007–2012 |
| Microsoft Windows | Windows Vista | 5.1.7 (May 9, 2012) | 2007–2012 |
| Microsoft Windows | Windows 7 | 5.1.7 (May 9, 2012) | 2009–2012 |
| Microsoft Windows | Windows 8 | 5.1.7 (May 9, 2012) | Unofficial |
| Microsoft Windows | Windows 10 | 5.1.7 (May 9, 2012) | Unofficial |
| Microsoft Windows | Windows 11 | 5.1.7 (May 9, 2012) | Unofficial |

== Features ==
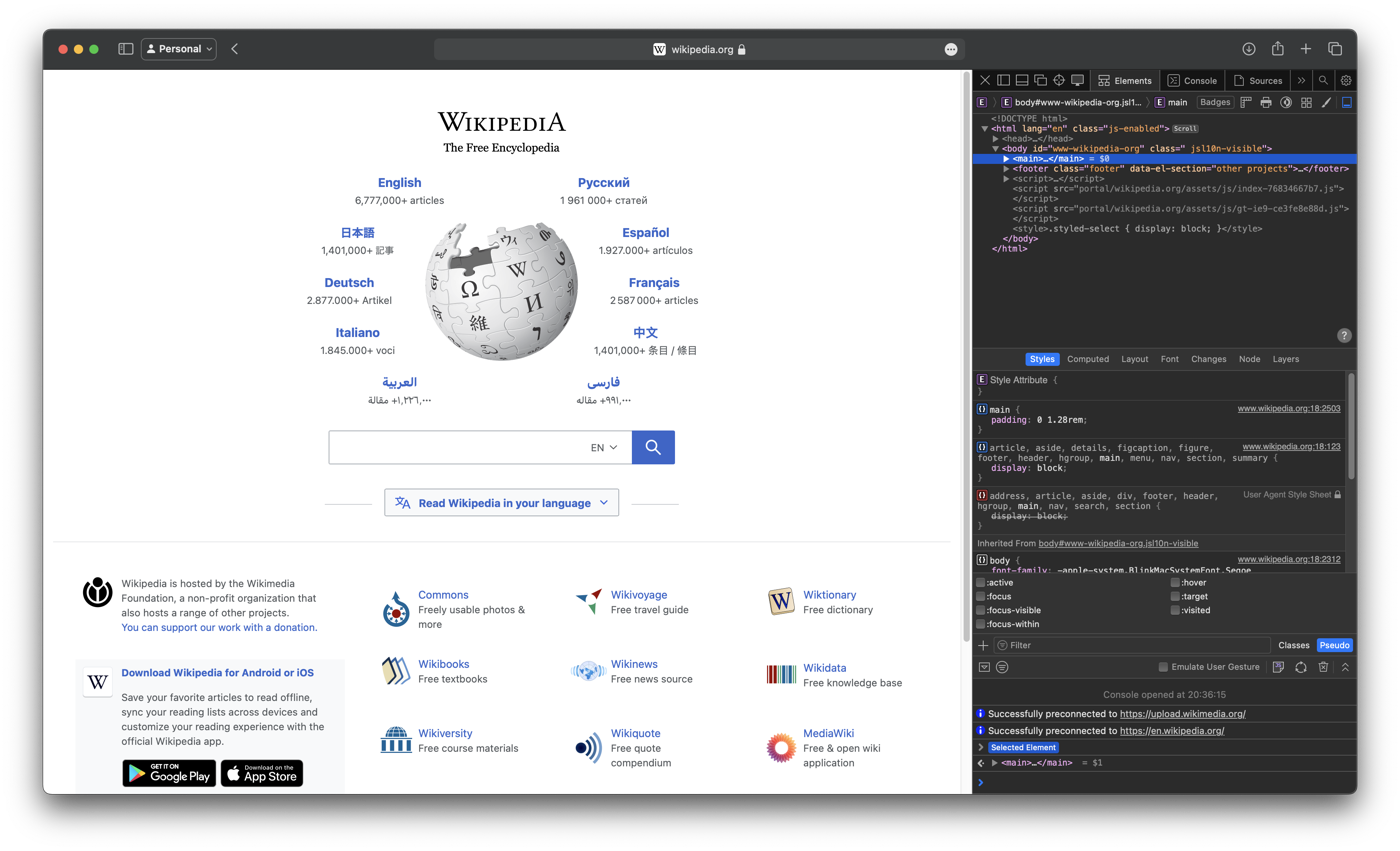
Safari's Web Inspector in macOS Sonoma

Until Safari 6.0, it included a built-in web feed aggregator that supported the RSS and Atom standards. Current features include Private Browsing (a mode in which the browser retains no record of information about the user's web activity), the ability to archive web content in WebArchive format, the ability to email complete web pages directly from a browser menu, the ability to search bookmarks, and the ability to share tabs between all Mac and iOS devices running appropriate versions of software via an iCloud account.

=== Web compatibility ===
In its early years, Safari helped push the web forward by supporting new technologies before many other browsers did. It was one of the first to introduce features like Canvas API, which later became a standard part of HTML5 and is now widely used for graphics, animations, and games in the browser.

However, by around 2015, Safari started getting criticism for not keeping up as well with newer web technologies compared to competitors like Google Chrome or Mozilla Firefox. Developers pointed out slower support for certain modern features and standards, which sometimes caused websites to behave differently or require extra work to function properly.

=== Privacy and security features ===
Safari has introduced several features meant to protect users against fingerprinting and third-party tracking. Since its initial release, Safari has used Webkit's "default cookie policy" that prevents a website from setting third-party cookies unless first-party cookies have already been set.

Safari 11.0 was released in September 2017 and added Intelligent Tracking Prevention (ITP), which included cross-site tracking prevention. This feature uses artificial intelligence (AI) to reduce the ability of advertisers to track Safari users as they browse the web. Cookies used for tracking would be allowed for 24 hours, then disabled, unless the AI system judges that the user wants to keep the cookie. This feature was enabled by default. Major advertising groups objected, saying it will reduce the free services supported by advertising, while other experts such as the Electronic Frontier Foundation praised the change.

Intelligent Tracking Prevention sets persistent cookies and other "script-written" files from websites to expire after seven days of no user interaction with the website. This cap for persistent cookies was added in February 2019 with the release of Safari 12.1. As of Safari 13.4 for iOS and Safari 13.1 for macOS, ITP sets the same seven-day expiry date for all files written by a website. These caps were added in response to third-party trackers using first-party "cookie jars" and other web storage directories to store trackers. Safari 13 also enabled full blocking of third-party, cross-site cookies by default.

Safari 17.0 introduced Link Tracking Protection, which removes tracking parameters added to URLs, preventing third-party sites from tracking the user's navigation behavior. This applies to all links opened in Private Browsing mode, as well as any links shared by users in Messages and Mail.

=== Plugin support ===
Apple used a remotely updated plug-in blacklist to prevent potentially dangerous or vulnerable plugins from running on Safari. Initially, Flash and Java content were blocked on some early versions of Safari. Since Safari 12, support for NPAPI plugins (except for Flash) has been completely dropped. Safari 14 finally dropped support for Adobe Flash Player.

=== WebExtension support ===
Beginning in 2018, Apple made technical changes to Safari's content blocking functionality which prompted backlash from users and developers of ad blocking extensions, who said the changes made it impossible to offer a similar level of user protection found in other browsers. Internally, the update limited the number of blocking rules which could be applied by third-party extensions, preventing the full implementation of community-developed blocklists. In response, several developers of popular ad and tracking blockers announced their products were being discontinued, as they were now incompatible with Safari's newly limited content blocking features. Beginning with Safari 13, popular extensions such as uBlock Origin no longer work with Safari.

=== iCloud sync ===
Safari can sync bookmarks, history, reading list, and tabs through iCloud. This happens by default if a user's Mac, iPhone, or iPad is logged in to iCloud, but syncing can be disabled in the Settings app (on iOS and iPadOS) or System Settings (on Mac).

iCloud Tabs lets users see a list of their other devices' open tabs that have not been added to a tab group. On iOS and iPadOS, these iCloud Tabs are shown below the grid of open tabs. On the Mac, they are shown at the bottom of the Tab Overview, or in an optional iCloud Tabs toolbar item.

=== Tab Groups ===
Safari 15 added tab groups. These tab groups, and the tabs they contain, can be synced across devices; when a tab is opened in a tab group on one device, it is added to that tab group on all devices, without needing to manually open it through iCloud Tabs. macOS Ventura added Shared Tab Groups, which can be shared through iMessage. New tabs and closed tabs will sync for all participants, and a small thumbnail with users' profile pictures will be visible on the tab they are currently viewing.

=== Handoff ===
Safari supports the Handoff feature, which allows users to continue where they left off on another device.

=== Sidebar ===
The Safari sidebar was introduced in Safari 8 as a way to access Bookmarks, Reading List, and Shared Tabs. The sidebar got its biggest update in Safari 16, when it added support for vertical tabs. This allows users to see their tabs arranged vertically in addition to the horizontal tab view in the top Toolbar.

=== Web standards and rendering ===
Safari uses the WebKit engine to render HTML and execute JavaScript. In 2005, Safari 2.0 became the first browser to pass the Acid2 rendering test, verifying its adherence to CSS and HTML standards. Modern versions support advanced web technologies, including WebAssembly, WebGPU, and the WebExtensions API, the latter of which allows for cross-browser extension compatibility.

== Architecture ==
On macOS, Safari is a Cocoa application. It uses Apple's WebKit for rendering web pages and running JavaScript. WebKit consists of WebCore (based on Konqueror's KHTML engine) and JavaScriptCore (originally based on KDE's JavaScript engine, named KJS). Like KHTML and KJS, WebCore and JavaScriptCore are free software and released under the terms of the GNU Lesser General Public License. Some Apple improvements to the KHTML code were merged back into the Konqueror project. Apple has also released some additional codes under the open source 2-clause BSD-like license. The version of Safari included in Mac OS X v10.6 (and later versions) is compiled for 64-bit architecture. Apple claimed that running Safari in 64-bit mode would increase rendering speeds by up to 50%.

WebKit2 has a multiprocess API for WebKit, where the web content is handled by a separate process from the application using WebKit. Apple announced WebKit2 in April 2010. Safari for OS X switched to the WebKit2 API with version 5.1. Safari for iOS switched to WebKit2 with iOS 8.

Safari has support for WebAssembly (Wasm), including some extensions, but one of them WasmGC has been off by default, since Safari Technology Preview 167, in 2023 and not having it (by default in Safari) has been blocking cross-platform software, many programming languages need it enabled in practice. It was still off by default in Safari 18, but changed to enabled on August 8, 2024, by the developers (so will likely be on in Safari 19, if not sooner, catching up with other web browsers like Google's Chrome on e.g. Android).

== Other platforms ==
=== iOS/iPadOS ===
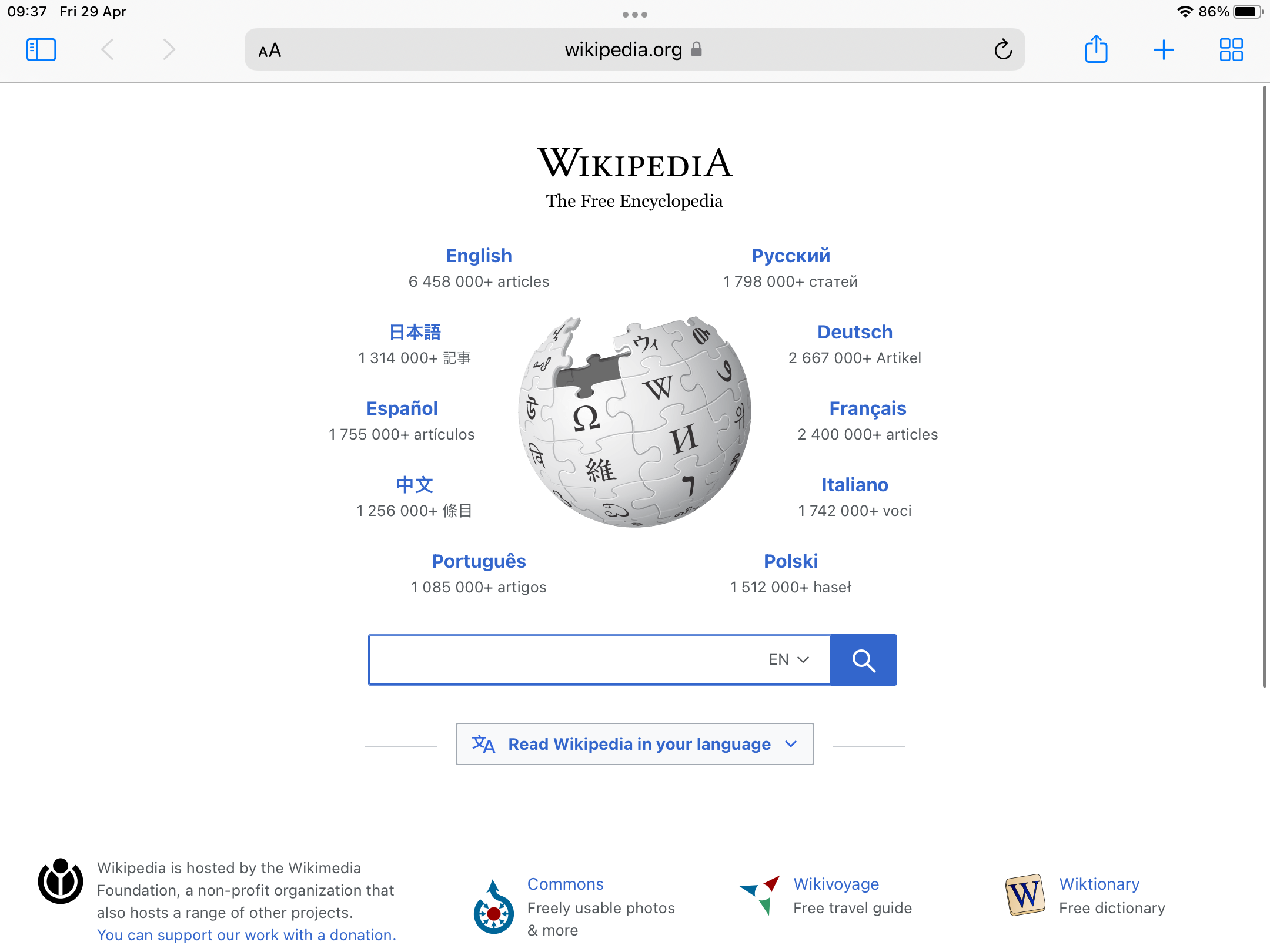
Safari 15 running on iPadOS 15

Safari for iPhone was released along with the original iPhone. It was well received at the time of release, with news outlets calling it "far superior" to other mobile browsers at the time.

Safari has also been available for iPadOS since its split from the main iOS operating system. With the release of iPadOS 13, Safari for iPad's user agent was changed to present itself to websites as Safari for Mac and shows the desktop version of websites, except in the miniature Slide Over multitasking view. Apple improved multitouch compatibility for desktop websites through several tweaks to the WebKit engine, for example, with heuristics to determine whether to translate a tap into a hover or a click. The iPadOS version also gained a download manager, support for Media Source Extensions to allow users to watch Netflix in Safari, and support for the custom keyboard shortcuts in web apps like Gmail, which override Safari's own keyboard shortcuts. External webcam support for websites was later added also.

The browser has continued to receive updates with new releases of iOS, such as the addition of browsing profiles for different use cases with iOS 17, and a locked private browsing feature. iOS 15 added support for third-party browser extensions, which can be downloaded and installed through corresponding apps via the App Store. Extensions available included VPNs and content blockers. Universal extensions that also worked with the Mac version of Safari can be created via a WebExtensions API.

=== visionOS ===
A Safari version for visionOS was released with the launch of the Apple Vision Pro headset in 2024, with features specific to the platform, such as moving browser windows around in virtual space. The Verge said it was the headset's "killer app" at launch, due to its versatility and potential for web experiences.

=== Windows ===
Safari for Windows was introduced along with the 3.0 version for Mac at Apple's WWDC conference in 2007, in an effort to increase overall Safari market share. It supported Windows XP and Vista at launch. Wired, in a review, praised its speed but criticised bugs at launch.

After Safari's release, Apple Software Update, an updater program bundled with QuickTime and iTunes for Windows, automatically selected Safari for installation, as a "recommended" program. This was criticized by John Lilly, then-CEO of Mozilla, who said it "borders on malware distribution practices". By late 2008, Apple Software Update stopped installing new software by default, though it still offered Safari in its list of available programs (with its checkbox unticked).

Safari for Windows was discontinued after version 5.1.7 released in 2010.

== Market share ==
Market share data of Safari

In 2009, Safari had a market share of 3.85%. It remained stable in that rank for five years with market shares of 5.56% (2010), 7.41% (2011), 10.07% (2012), and 11.77% (2013). In 2014, it caught up with Firefox with a market share of 14.20%. In 2015, Safari became the second most-used web browser worldwide after Google Chrome, and had a market share of 13.01%. From 2015 to 2020, it occupied market shares of 14.02%, 14.86%, 14.69%, 17.68% and 19.25%, respectively. As of November 2021, Google Chrome continued to be the most popular browser with Safari (19.22%) following behind in second place.

In May 2022, according to StatCounter, Apple's Safari dropped to the third most popular desktop browser after being overtaken by Microsoft Edge. Safari was then used by 9.61% of desktop computers worldwide. One year later, Safari retook second place.

Desktop/laptop browser statistics
| Google Chrome | 72.59% |
| Microsoft Edge | 10.49% |
| Mozilla Firefox | 6.02% |
| Safari | 5.14% |
| Opera | 1.78% |
| Other | 3.59% |
Desktop web browser market share according to StatCounter for June 2026

== Criticism ==
=== Security updates for Snow Leopard and Windows ===
Software security firm Sophos detailed how Snow Leopard and Windows users were not supported by the Safari 6 release at the time, while there were over 121 vulnerabilities left unpatched on those platforms. Since then, Snow Leopard has had only three minor version releases of Safari (the most recent in September 2013), and Windows has had none. While no official word has been released by Apple, the indication is that these are the final versions available for these operating systems, and both retain significant security issues.

=== Potential anticompetitive practices ===
Apple has been criticized for anticompetitive practices related to Safari on iOS. Before iOS 14 (2020), users could not change their default browser, so links always opened in Safari. App Store rules still require all third-party iOS browsers to use Safari's WebKit browser engine, inheriting its limitations. Apple's stated motivation for this browser engine restriction was to increase security, an argument disputed by the UK's Competition and Markets Authority. The European Union's Digital Markets Act regulation, passed in 2022, requires Apple to allow alternative browser engines. In response, Google and Mozilla began porting their browser engines to iOS.

=== IP leak and censorship of GitLab ===
Apple Inc. has been sharing the IP addresses of Safari users in China mainland with Tencent Safe Browsing since at least 2019. Apple originally said the Tencent blocklist would be used only for Safari users in mainland China. However, after 24 November 2022, Apple quietly edited its Safari privacy policy to note the Tencent blacklist would be used for devices in Hong Kong as well, while Google is not yet blocked by the Government of Hong Kong, unlike mainland China. In 2022, Hong Kong former Apple Inc. senior software engineer Chu Ka-cheong discovered that Apple Safari blocked GitLab in mainland China and Hong Kong due to Tencent's blacklist, which labeled GitLab, a California-based American software company and the first partly Ukrainian unicorn, as containing dangerous "misinformation." Maciej Stachowiak, who is the leader of Apple WebKit, replied with “we will look into it.”

=== Payments from Google ===
In November 2023, during the US's search engine antitrust trial against Google, an economics professor at the University of Chicago revealed that Google pays Apple 36% of all search advertising revenue generated when users access Google through the Safari browser. These payments reached $20 billion in 2022, according to Eddy Cue, Apple's senior vice president of services.

Both Apple and Google have argued that disclosing the specific terms of their search default agreement would harm their competitive positions. However, the court ruled that the information was relevant to the antitrust case and ordered its disclosure. This revelation has raised concerns about the dominance of Google in the search engine market and the potential anticompetitive effects of its agreements with Apple.

== See also ==
- List of web browsers
- History of web browsers
- United States v. Google Inc. in which the FTC alleged that Google misrepresented privacy assurances to Safari users
