= WHATWG =

Community interested in evolving HTML and related technologies

Web Hypertext Application Technology Working Group
- Abbreviation: WHATWG
- Formation: 4 June 2004; 22 years ago
- Members: Apple Inc., Google LLC, Microsoft Corporation, Mozilla Corporation
- Main organ: Steering Group
- Website: whatwg.org

The Web Hypertext Application Technology Working Group (WHATWG) was founded by representatives from Apple Inc., the Mozilla Foundation and Opera Software, leading web browser vendors in 2004. WHATWG is responsible for maintaining multiple web-related technical standards, including the specifications for the HyperText Markup Language (HTML) and the Document Object Model (DOM). The central organizational membership and control of WHATWG – its "Steering Group" – consists of Apple, Mozilla, Google, and Microsoft. WHATWG editors of the specifications ensure correct implementation, in consultation with participants, but ultimately in accordance with Steering Group member objectives.

== History ==
The WHATWG was formed in response to the slow development of World Wide Web Consortium (W3C) Web standards and W3C's decision to abandon HTML in favor of XML-based technologies. The WHATWG mailing list was announced on 4 June 2004, two days after the initiatives of a joint Opera–Mozilla position paper had been voted down by the W3C members at the W3C Workshop on Web Applications and Compound Documents.

On 10 April 2007, the Mozilla Foundation, Apple, and Opera Software proposed that the new HTML working group of the W3C adopt the WHATWG's HTML5 as the starting point of its work and name its future deliverable as "HTML5" (though the WHATWG specification was later renamed HTML Living Standard).

On 9 May 2007, the new HTML working group of the W3C resolved to do that. An Internet Explorer platform architect from Microsoft was invited but did not join, citing the lack of a patent policy to ensure all specifications can be implemented on a royalty-free basis. Since then, the W3C and the WHATWG had been developing HTML independently, at times causing specifications to diverge.

In 2017, the WHATWG established an intellectual property rights agreement that includes a patent policy. This spurred a renewed attempt to allow the W3C and the WHATWG to work together on specifications. In 2019, the W3C and WHATWG agreed to a memorandum of understanding where development of HTML and DOM specifications would be done principally in the WHATWG.

The editor has significant control over the specification, but the community can influence the decisions of the editor. In one case, editor Ian Hickson proposed replacing the <time> tag with a more generic <data> tag, but the community disagreed and the change was reverted.

=== Web Hypertext Application Technology Task Force ===
Initially, the name Web Hypertext Application Technology Task Force was also used, along with variant abbreviations including WHAT Working Group, WHAT Task Force and WHATTF. After some time using both the whattf.org and whatwg.org domain names, the name WHATWG was eventually standardized on. The namespace URI http://whattf.org/datatype-draft remains in use for the HTML validator's data type library.

=== Transition of HTML Publication to WHATWG ===
On 28 May 2019, the W3C announced that WHATWG would be the sole publisher of the HTML and DOM standards. The W3C and WHATWG had been publishing competing standards since 2012. While the W3C standard was identical to the WHATWG, in 2007, the standards have since progressively diverged due to different design decisions. The WHATWG "Living Standard" had been the de facto web standard for some time.

== Specifications ==
The WHATWG publishes a number of standards that form a substantial portion of the web platform including:

- The HTML Living Standard (sometimes informally called HTML5). The HTML specification has been a living document without version numbers since 2011. It includes both HTML, the core markup language for the web, and a number of related APIs.
- The DOM Standard, defines how the Document Object Model on the web is supposed to work and replaces W3C DOM level 3. For example, it replaces mutation events with mutation observers.
- Fetch Standard, which "defines requests, responses, and the process that binds them: fetching." The fetch standard defines the 'fetch' JavaScript API, and supersedes the HTML5 fetch functionality, CORS and the HTTP Origin header semantics.
- The Streams Standard provides APIs for creating, composing, and consuming streams of data. These streams are designed to map efficiently to low-level I/O primitives, and allow easy composition with built-in backpressure and queueing. On top of streams, the web platform can build higher-level abstractions, such as filesystem or socket APIs, while at the same time users can use the supplied tools to build their own streams which integrate well with those of the web platform.
- The Encoding Standard defines how character encodings such as Windows-1252 and UTF-8 are handled in web browsers and is intended to replace the IETF encodings registry.
- The MIME type sniffing standard defines how MIME types are supposed to be sniffed in web browsers.
- The URL standard defines how URLs are supposed to be parsed in web browsers.
- Web IDL used to describe interfaces that are intended to be implemented in web browsers.

== See also ==
- Ecma International
- Document Object Model
- HyperText Markup Language
