= Chairperson of the Personal Information Protection Commission (South Korea) =

Head of South Korean data protection authority

- 개인정보 보호위원회 위원장
- Incumbent; Ko Hak-soo since 7 October 2022
- Personal Information Protection Commission
- Nominator: Prime minister
- Appointer: President of South Korea
- Term length: Three years (once renewable); No restriction on renewal
- Constituting instrument: Personal Information Protection Act
- Formation: 30 September 2011
- First holder: Park Jong-tae (before 2020 reform); Yoon Jong-in (after 2020 reform)
- Deputy: Vice Chairperson
- Website: www.pipc.go.kr/eng

The Chairperson of the Personal Information Protection Commission (Korean: 개인정보 보호위원회 위원장; Hanja: 個人情報 保護委員會 委員長; RR: Gaeinjeongbo bohowiwonhoe wiwonjang) is the Chairperson of the Personal Information Protection Commission in South Korea. As head of the commission, the Chairperson represents the Personal Information Protection Commission.

== Appointment and Duties ==
According to 'Personal Information Protection Act (PIPA, Korean: 개인정보 보호법)' amended in 2020 article 7-2(2), the chairperson is recommended by the Prime minister and appointed by the President. Currently in year 2022, this appointment procedure does not require legislature consent or hearing.

Yet as one of the nine commissioners constituting the commission, candidate for the chair should fulfill one of following career requirement under article 7-2(2); Civil service with Grade III or higher on data protection, or more than 10 years as lawyer, or more than 3 years as executive in organization specialized in data protection, or more than 5 years as professor in universities.

The chairperson has following powers and duties according to the PIPA.

- By article 7-2(2), the chair nominates two of nine commissioners in the commission, to be appointed by the President.
- By article 7-3(1), the chair presides every session of the commission, and handles administrative task of the commission.
- By article 7-3(3) and (4), the chair can participate and speak opinion in the National Assembly or the State Council on tasks of the commission.

== Tenure and Treatment ==
After reformation of the Commission in 2020, the chair is now treated as equal as other minister in South Korean government. It has three-year tenure and protected from removal during its term by article 7-4 and 7–5. This status guarantees role of the commission as independent agency on data protection affairs.

== List of the Chairs ==
=== List of Chairs before PIPC as central administrative agency ===
No.	Name	Tenure	Appointed by	Ref.
1	Park Jong-tae	2 December 2011 - 28 March 2013	Lee Myung-bak	
2	Jeong Ha-kyung	30 May 2013 - 29 May 2016	Park Geun-hye	
3	Lee Hong-sub	30 May 2016 - 29 May 2019	Park Geun-hye	
-	Kim Il-jae (acting)	29 May 2019 - 5 August 2020	Moon Jae-in	

=== List of Chairs after PIPC as central administrative agency ===
No.	Name	Tenure	Appointed by	Ref.
1	Yoon Jong-in	5 August 2020 - 6 October 2022	Moon Jae-in	
2	Ko Hak-soo	7 October 2022 -	Yoon Suk-yeol	

== See also ==
- Personal Information Protection Commission (South Korea)
- National data protection authority
- State Council of South Korea
