= Polish Data Protection Commissioner =

- President of the Personal Data Protection Office
- Prezes Urzędu Ochrony Danych Osobowych
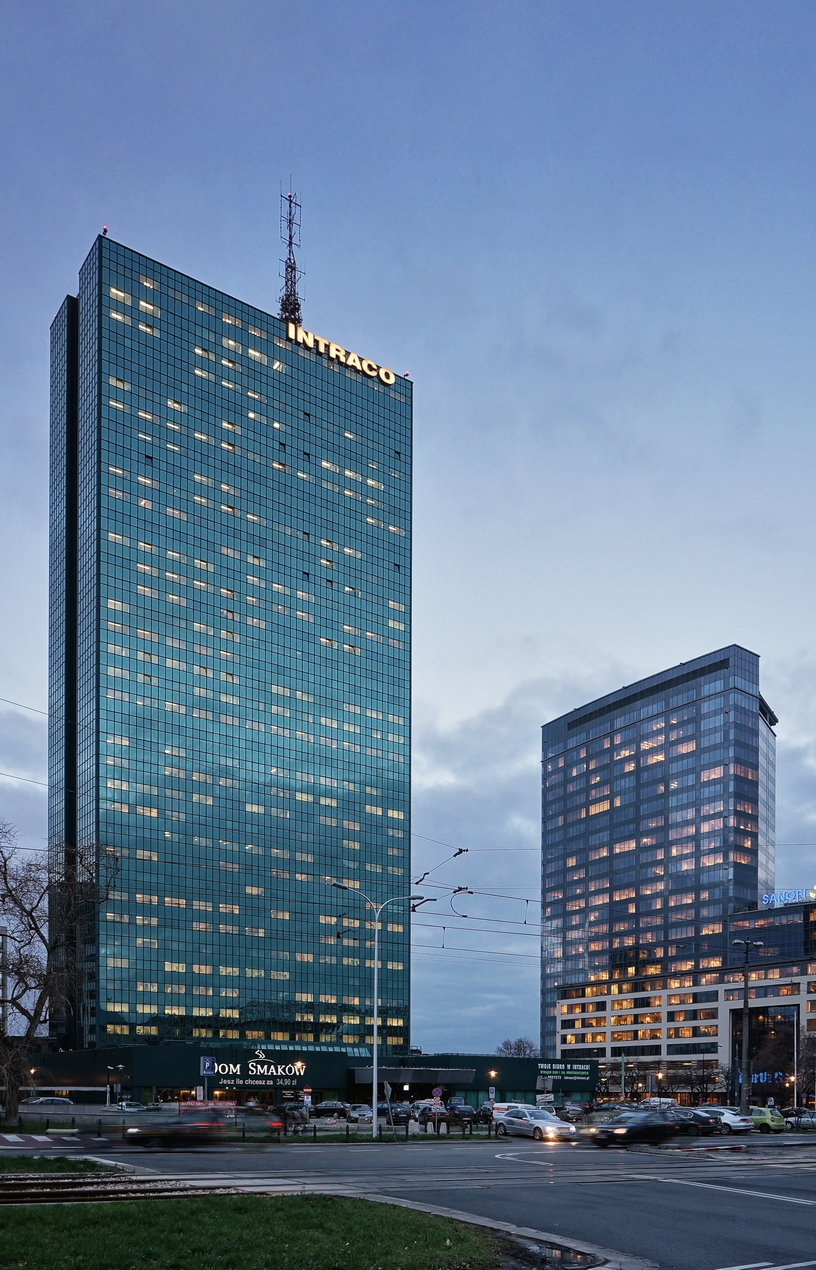
- Intraco I (left), the main building of the President's Office
- Established: August 29, 1997; 29 years ago
- Type: national data protection authority, information commissioner
- Purpose: data protection
- Headquarters: Intraco I
- Location: Warsaw, Poland
- Origins: Data Protection Act 2018
- Region served: Poland
- President: Mirosław Wróblewski
- Website: https://uodo.gov.pl/en
- Formerly called: General Inspector of Personal Data Protection

The Office of the Polish Data Protection Commissioner or officially President of the Personal Data Protection Office (Polish: Prezes Urzędu Ochrony Danych Osobowych, PUODO) is an independent national data protection authority responsible for upholding the European Union fundamental right of individuals to data privacy through the enforcement and monitoring of compliance with data protection legislation in Poland. The authority has been headed by Mirosław Wróblewski since 26 January 2024; its deputy presidents are Agnieszka Grzelak and Konrad Komornicki.

== About the authority ==
It was established on 29 August 1997 as the General Inspector of Personal Data Protection (Polish: Generalny Inspektor Ochrony Danych Osobowych, GIODO). The General Inspector controlled the compliance of data processing with the provisions of the 1997 Data Protection Act (Polish: Ustawa z dnia 29 sierpnia 1997 r. o ochronie danych osobowych), issued administrative decisions and examined complaints on the implementation of the provisions on personal data protection, kept the register of data sets, provided opinions on legal acts on personal data protection, initiated and undertook undertakings to improve personal data protection, participated in the work of international organisations and institutions dealing with personal data protection issues (e.g. the Article 29 Working Group).

The General Inspector was appointed for a 4-year term (counting from the date of taking the oath of office) by the Sejm with the consent of the Senate. General Inspectors were subject only to the law in the performance of their duties and were entitled to legal immunity. The Bureau assisted the General Inspector in performing its tasks.

Under Article 20 of the 1997 Act, the Inspector General submitted a report on its activities to the Sejm once a year, together with conclusions resulting from the state of compliance with the provisions on personal data protection. The report was available as a parliamentary print.

On 10 May 2018, the Sejm of the eighth legislative term enacted a new Data Protection Act, which replaced the 1997 Act and provided for the liquidation of the authority and the establishment of a new authority competent for the protection of personal data, the President of the Personal Data Protection Office.

The independent role and powers of the national data protection authority are as set out in legislation in the Data Protection Act 2018 (Polish: Ustawa z 10 maja 2018 roku o ochronie danych osobowych). According to Articles 159-171 of the 2018 Act, the President of the Office is the legal continuator of the General Inspector of Personal Data Protection. It has retained its assets and claims and taken over the proceedings initiated by the General Inspector.

The authority is based in Poland's capital, Warsaw, and its commissioner is an independent administrative body elected by members of the Lower House of Polish Parliament (Polish: Sejm) and approved by the Senate. Dr. Edyta Bielak-Jomaa became the first President in 2018 after serving as the Inspector General from 2015 to 2018. The prefix "Minister" (abbreviated to "Min.") is an honorific style that is traditionally used before the names of former and acting general inspectors and commissioners.

Some initiatives of the Polish Data Protection Commissioner's Office include encouraging personal data protection awareness and promoting data protection education. The office organises an annual essay contest addressed to law students at Polish universities and awards the Data Protection Commissioner's Prize for best essays on privacy law and administrative law.

== List of General Inspectors and Commissioners ==
=== General Inspectors (1998-2018) ===
- First term (4 April 1998 - 26 April 2002): Ewa Kulesza
- Second term (26 April 2002 - 13 July 2006): Ewa Kulesza
- Third term (13 July 2006 - 3 August 2010): Michał Serzycki
- Fourth term (4th August 2010 - 28th August 2014): Wojciech Wiewiórowski
- Fifth term (29 August 2014 - 18 December 2014): Wojciech Wiewiórowski
- Sixth term (22 April 2015 - 25 May 2018): Edyta Bielak-Jomaa

=== Commissioners (since 2018) ===
- First term (25 May 2018 - 16 May 2019): Edyta Bielak-Jomaa
- Second term (16 May 2019 - 26 January 2024): Jan Nowak
- Third term (from 26 January 2024): Mirosław Wróblewski
