= PIPC =

PIPC may refer to:

- Palisades Interstate Park Commission, a governing body for Palisades Interstate Park
- Pengerang Integrated Petroleum Complex, a development project in Malaysia
- Personal Information Protection Commission (South Korea), a national data protection authority in South Korea
