= Lusha =

Israeli-American sales intelligence software company

- Type: Private
- Industry: Sales intelligence
- Founded: 2016
- Founders: Yoni Tserruya; Assaf Eisenstein
- Headquarters: Boston, Massachusetts, United States
- Area served: Worldwide
- Key people: Yoni Tserruya (CEO)
- Products: Sales intelligence software
- Number of employees: 400 ±99 (2026)
- Website: www.lusha.com

Lusha is an Israeli-American sales intelligence software company founded in 2016 by Yoni Tserruya and Assaf Eisenstein. The company develops software that provides business contact and company data.

== History ==
Lusha was founded in 2016 by Yoni Tserruya and Assaf Eisenstein. The company initially developed a browser extension that provided business contact information for sales prospecting and lead generation.

The company operated without external investment during its first five years. By early 2021, it reported more than 520,000 registered users and 14,000 paying customers.

In February 2021, Lusha raised $40 million in a Series A funding round led by PSG, marking the company's first institutional investment.

In November 2021, the company raised $205 million in a Series B funding round led by PSG, with participation from ION Crossover Partners. The funding valued Lusha at approximately $1.5 billion.

In 2022, venture capital firm Plus Ventures and investor Oren Abekasis filed a lawsuit against Lusha and its founders, seeking recognition of an ownership stake in the company based on investments in an earlier venture. Lusha disputed the claims.

In July 2022, Lusha announced layoffs affecting approximately 10% of its workforce amid a broader downturn in the technology sector.

In January 2025, Lusha acquired Novacy, an Israeli conversation intelligence software company. Financial terms of the transaction were not disclosed.

In December 2025, the company announced another round of layoffs affecting approximately 8% of its workforce as part of a restructuring effort.

== Products ==
Lusha develops sales intelligence software that provides business contact data, company information, prospecting tools, and data enrichment services. Its products are used by sales, marketing, recruiting, and revenue operations teams and integrate with customer relationship management systems and other business software platforms.

== Privacy and regulatory scrutiny ==
Lusha's collection and distribution of business contact information has attracted regulatory scrutiny and legal challenges in several jurisdictions.

In 2022, the French data protection authority examined whether the company's activities fell within the scope of the General Data Protection Regulation (GDPR). The investigation was later closed without enforcement action.

In Italy, the data protection authority (Garante) opened an investigation into Lusha Systems Inc.'s processing of personal data of Italian residents.
