= Ernesto Kreplak =

Argentine politician

Under Secretary of the Registry Management Coordination and Control

Personal details
- Education: University of Buenos Aires
- Profession: Lawyer and teacher

Ernesto Kreplak is a lawyer who graduated from the University of Buenos Aires. He holds a Master's degree and serves as regular lecturer in the School of Law (University of Buenos Aires)actualmente se desempeña como Juez Federal del Juzgado en lo Criminal y Correccional Federal Número 3 de La Plata .

== Biography ==
Since January 2011, he has served as Undersecretary of the Registry Management Coordination and Control of the Ministry of Justice and Human Rightshasta el año 2015.

Since July 2015, he has served as Juez Federal del Juzgado en lo Criminal y Correccional Federal de La Plata Corte Suprema de la Nación Argentina.

He is affiliated with La Cámpora, and has been denounced for refusing to release public information about the Ciccone printhouse during the Boudougate scandal. He is currently running for the position of prosecutor. He represents the executive power of Argentina in the jury against José María Campagnoli, the prosecutor that investigated The Route of the K-Money.

== Management ==
Kreplak has managed the implementation and deployment of the National Registry for Rural Lands for the protection of the national domain over the property of rural lands, being the first unit of the Ministry of Justice and Human Rights to obtain IRAM Quality Standards Certification, and the creation and development of the Program “Con vos en la web” the purpose of which is to protect the personal data of children on the Internet.
