= Giovanni Buttarelli =

Italian civil servant (1957–2019)

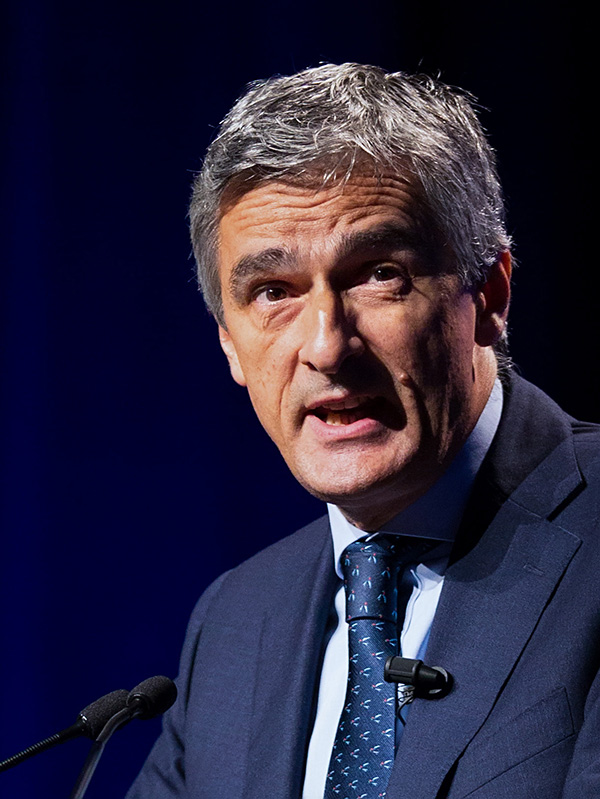
- Buttarelli in 2014

European Data Protection Supervisor
- In office 4 December 2014 – 20 August 2019
- Preceded by: Peter Hustinx
- Succeeded by: Wojciech Wiewiórowski

Assistant European Data Protection Supervisor
- In office 2009–2014

Secretary General at Garante per la protezione dei dati personali
- In office 1997–2009

Personal details
- Born: 24 June 1957 Frascati, Italy
- Died: 20 August 2019 (aged 62) Milan, Italy
- Education: Sapienza University of Rome

Giovanni Buttarelli (24 June 1957 – 20 August 2019) was an Italian civil servant, who served as the European Data Protection Supervisor (EDPS). On 4 December 2014, he was appointed by a joint decision of the European Parliament and the Council. He was due to serve a five-year term in this position. Previously, he served as Assistant EDPS, from January 2009 until December 2014. He was also a member of the Italian judiciary with the rank of judge of the Court of Cassation.

Before joining the EDPS, Buttarelli worked as Secretary General of the Garante per la protezione dei dati personali, the Italian Data Protection Authority, between 1997 and 2009.

== Background ==
Giovanni Buttarelli was born in 1957 in Frascati, a little town near Rome. He graduated “cum laude” from La Sapienza University in Rome in 1984, where he also worked as a teaching assistant at the Faculty of Law. Specifically, he worked with Prof. Franco Cordero on Criminal Procedure until 1990. He was appointed as a Professor at the Faculty of Law at Lumsa University in Rome, in 2005, where he lectured on the Protection of Personal data and Fundamental Rights in Italy and Europe. In 1989, he was made a judge at the Tribunal of Avezzano.

He was also appointed to the High Level Policy Panel of the European Project on "Public Perception of Security and Privacy: Assessing Knowledge, Collecting Evidence, Translating Research Into Action - PACT (285635)” by the Peace Institute of Oslo.

Along with 138 other national representatives, he signed the Italian Manifest for a Digital Agenda in 2011. He was also a regular contributor to specialised books and journals, at both the European and national level and is the author of a significant number of papers.

== Career ==
=== Legislation Department of the Italian Ministry of Justice (1989–1997) ===
From 1989 to 1997, Buttarelli was an advisor at the Legislation Department of the Italian Ministry of Justice.

He cooperated with various ministers and contributed to drafting and following up many regulatory provisions, in particular concerning criminal law, criminal procedure and data protection. He was also a member of several inter-ministerial committees concerning, among other topics, immigration, racial discrimination, community fraud, de-criminalisation, tax reforms, computer crime laws, access to confidential records and the digitalisation of public administrative agencies.

He is the author of Italian privacy law Legge sulla privacy n. 675/96 on the processing of personal data.

=== Council of Europe (1990–2019) ===
In 1990, Buttarelli was appointed as a member of various Working Groups and Committees, such as the Convention 108 Consultative Committee, the Center for Just Peace and Democracy, the Group of Specialists on Access to Public Information and the Working Group on Data Protection in Police and Criminal Matters.

As an expert appointed by the Council of Europe, he drafted the report and the draft guidelines on video surveillance (2003) and the report and draft recommendation on the protection of personal data processed for employment purposes (2011–2013). He was also an adviser to the Venice Commission on an Opinion on "Video surveillance and Personal Rights”.

In addition, Buttarelli was a member of various Council Working Parties such as those negotiating Directives no. 95/46/EC (current EU data protection directive) and 97/66/EC (on the protection of privacy in the telecommunications sector). He participated in the Art. 31 Committee of Directive n.95/46/EC until 1999 and he was member of the Working Party ex Article 29 set up by Directive 95/46/EC.

In 1996, during the EU Italian Presidency period, he chaired the Working Group which drafted the common position on Directive no. 97/66/EC.

=== Italian Data Protection Authority and the European Data Protection Supervisor (1997–2019) ===
From 1997 to 2009, Buttarelli worked as Secretary General at the Garante per la protezione dei dati personali, the Italian Data Protection Authority. He was president of the Joint Supervisory Authority set up in pursuance of the Schengen Agreement in 2002–2003, after being its vice-president in 2000–2001. In 2011, he was elected chair of the CIS-Customs Supervision Coordination Group. In 2014, he succeeded Peter Hustinx in the role of European Data Protection Supervisor, after serving as Assistant Supervisor for one mandate from 2009 to 2014.

=== Moscow Mechanism (2010–2017) ===
Upon designation of the Italian Minister of Foreign Affairs, he was included for six years in the OSCE, (Organization for security and Co-operation in Europe) resource list of the Moscow Mechanism, including eminent persons experienced in the field of the human dimension, from whom an impartial performance of their functions may be expected, at disposal of the OSCE-ODIHR Office to contribute to the solution of specific problems concerning the respect of human rights and the human dimension.

=== Death ===
Buttarelli died on 20 August 2019, at the age of 62. His 'manifesto', Privacy 2030: A New Vision for Europe, was published posthumously in November 2019. On his death, Apple CEO, Tim Cook called Buttarelli "a visionary who advanced the cause of privacy in Europe and around the world."
