= Data vault =

Data vault or Data Vault may refer to:

- Data vault modeling, a database modeling method
- Data vaulting, or off-site data protection
- DataVault or Data Vault, an early massive data storage system
- Data Vault, product of Personal, Inc.
- Data Vault, product of Callpod
