= Confederation of European Data Protection Organisations =

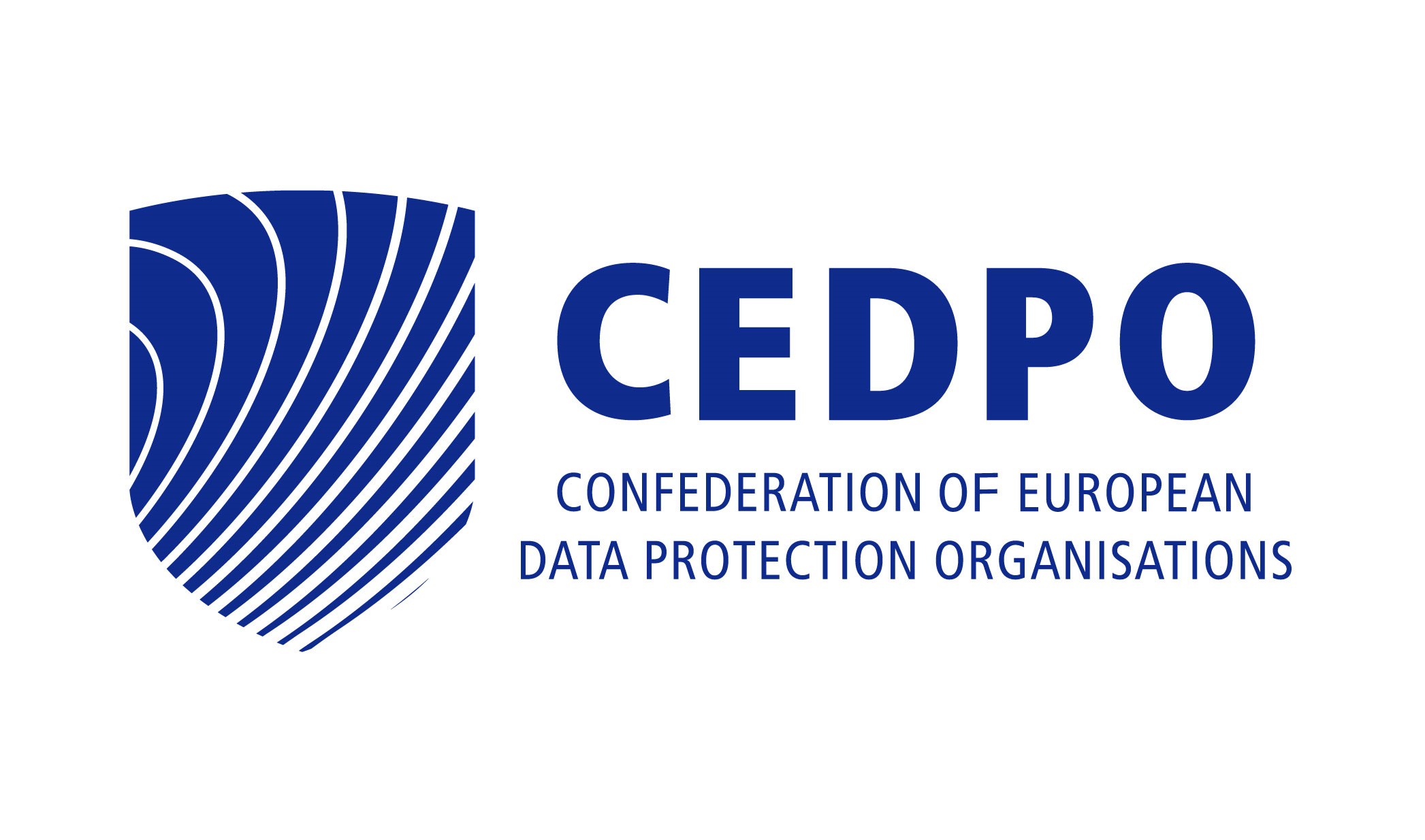
- CEDPO
- Established: September 2011
- Purpose: Commitment for a balanced, practicable, and effective data protection
- Members: 10
- Website: www.cedpo.eu

The Confederation of European Data Protection Organisations (CEDPO) is a European umbrella organisation of data protection organisations.

== Data protection umbrella organisation ==
CEDPO was founded in September 2011 by national data protection organisations as their European umbrella organisation, so far (2014) without any explicit legal form. CEDPO pursues to promote the role of the Data Protection Officer and to provide advice on balanced, practicable, and effective data protection. In addition, CEDPO aims to contribute to a better harmonisation of data protection law and practices in the European Union (EU) / European Economic Area (EEA).

== Founder members ==
The four founder members of CEDPO are the Association française des correspondants à la protection des données à caractère personnel (AFCDP, France), the Asociación Profesional Española de Privacidad (APEP, Spain), the Gesellschaft für Datenschutz und Datensicherheit e.V. (GDD, Germany) and the Nederlands Genootschap van Functionarissen voor de Gegevensbescherming (NGFG, Netherlands).

== Members ==
Present legal entities of CEDPO include:

- Association of Data Protection Officers (ADPO), Ireland, http://www.dpo.ie/
- Association Française des Correspondants à la Protection des Données à Caractère Personnel (AFCDP), France, http://www.afcdp.net/
- Asociación Profesional Española de Privacidad (APEP), Spanien, http://www.apep.es/
- ARGE Daten, Austria, http://www.argedaten.at/
- Association Data Protection Officer (ASSO DPO), Italy, https://www.assodpo.it/
- Gesellschaft für Datenschutz und Datensicherheit (GDD) e.V., Germany, https://www.gdd.de/
- Nederlands Genootschap van Functionarissen voor de Gegevensbescherming (NGFG), Netherlands, http://www.ngfg.nl/
- Stowarzyszenie Administratorów Bezpieczeństwa Informacji (SABI), Poland, http://www.sabi.org.pl/
- Associação de Encarregados de Proteção de Dados (AEPD), Portugal, https://www.aepd.pt/
- Asociația Specialiștilor în Confidențialitate și Protecția Datelor (ASCPD), Romania, https://ascpd.ro/
