= Wojciech Wiewiórowski =

European Data Protection Supervisor since 2019

Wojciech Rafał Wiewiórowski
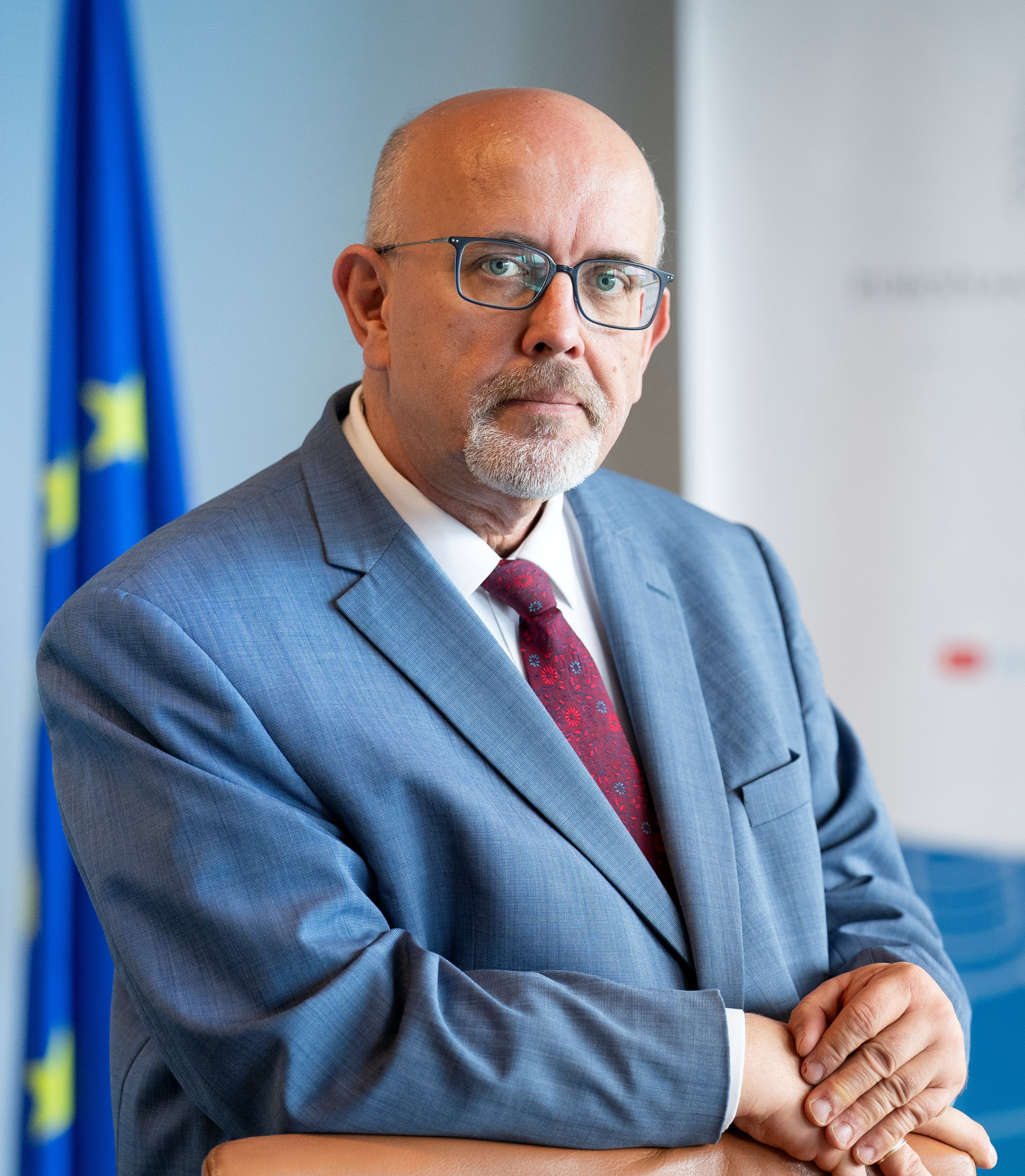

European Data Protection Supervisor
- Incumbent
- Assumed office 5 December 2019
- Preceded by: Giovanni Buttarelli

Personal details
- Born: 13 June 1971 Łęczyca, Poland
- Education: University of Gdańsk

Wojciech Wiewiórowski (Polish pronunciation: [ˈvɔjt͡ɕɛx vjɛvjuˈrɔfskʲi]) is a Polish lawyer, university teacher and European Data Protection Supervisor. He is a former General Inspector of the Personal Data Protection in Poland (2010-2014).

== Biography ==
He was born on June 13, 1971 in Łęczyca, Central Poland. In 1995 he graduated from Faculty of and Administration in University of Gdańsk, the School of English and European Law organised in Poland by the University of Cambridge, the Summer School of International Law organised by the Catholic University of America and the Jagiellonian University and the Singapore Co-operation Programme: “eGovernment - Journey Towards Public Sector Excellence”. He was the finalist of the Central and Eastern European Moot Court Competition organised by the University of Cambridge in 1998. Between 1996-2004 worked for law publishing house and co-authored legal information retrieval systems. He also taught European and constitutional law at the Gdansk School of Public Administration and Gdańsk University of Technology.

He obtained his PhD in law in 2000 ("The Principle of the Separation of Powers under the Judicial Review and the Constitutional Role of Courts in United States of America") and habilitation in 2021 (“Legal Guarantees for Sustainable Information Processing at the Age of Big Data”).

His main research interests include Polish and European law of new technologies, information processing and cybersecurity, LegalTech, informatization of public administration, development of legal information retrieval systems, personal data protection, and application of semantic web and artificial intelligence in legal information processing. He is co-author of works in this field and of the textbook "Legal Informatics. Information technology for lawyers and for public administration". He has given over 700 presentations at national and international scientific conferences on new technology law and information management issues. He is a member of the programme committee of the journals “The European Data Protection Law Review” and “Prawo Mediów Elektronicznych”. He is a member of the Polish European Law Association (PSPE), the Scientific Association of the Law and Information Centre (NCPI) and the Consultative Boar a6d of the Maritime Cybersecurity Centre at Polish Naval Academy in Gdynia.

2006-2008 he served as an advisor on e-government in the political cabinet of the Minister of Internal Affairs and Administration in Poland and then as Director of the Department of Informatisation in the Ministry of Internal Affairs and Administration (2008-2010), and by virtue of this position he also became Secretary of the Committee of the Council of Ministers for Informatisation and Communications. In 2010 he represented Poland in the Committee on Interoperability Solutions for European Public Administrations at the European Commission (ISA Committee). He also served as Co-Chairman of the Regulatory Commission for the Polish Orthodox Church (2006-2008). In 2010, he was appointed to the Archival Council of the Minister of Culture and National Heritage. In 2008 he took the position of the Chief Information Officer in this ministry.

On 25 June 2010 he was appointed as the General Inspector of the Personal Data Protection for Poland. He was holding that position until 2014, when he became the Assistant Supervisor of the European Data Protection Supervisor, at that time Giovanni Buttarelli. From February to November 2014, he served as Vice-Chair. When Giovanni Buttarelli died, Wojciech Wiewiórowski was appointed as in-charge. Then in November 2019 he was recommended by the European Parliament to take the seat of the Inspector. He took the office on 6 December 2019.

He lives in Brussels with his wife and two daughters.
