= Office of the Data Protection Supervisor =

The Isle of Man Information Commissioner (Manx: Oik Oaseir Coadey Fysseree) is the national data protection authority for the Isle of Man under the Data Protection Act 2018 (an Act of Tynwald). The office was originally created as the Isle of Man Data Protection Registrar by the Data Protection Act 1986. In 2015 with the introduction of the Freedom of Information Act the name of office was changed to the Office of the Information Commissioner.

The office is held by Dr Alexandra Delaney-Bhattacharya, who was appointed in 2024.

The Office is funded by a mix of the Treasury and registration fees, but is independent of the Isle of Man Government.

== See also ==
- Information privacy
