= Personal data service =

A personal data service (PDS) gives the user a central point of control for their personal information (e.g. interests, contact information, affiliations, preferences, friends). The user's data attributes being managed by the service may be stored in a co-located repository, or they may be stored in multiple external distributed repositories, or a combination of both. Attributes from a PDS may be accessed via an API. Users of the same PDS instance may be allowed to selectively share sets of attributes with other users. A data ecosystem is developing where such sharing among projects or "operators" may become practicable.

The concept of a PDS can be differentiated from another closely related term, personal data store. "A personal data store is a physical repository for data over which an individual exerts access control. Again, the term itself does not imply where such a store lives on the network (i.e., in the cloud, on a local device, in a smart card, on a SIM, etc.)". The word "store" implies that a personal data store actually stores personal data, whereas the emphasis of a PDS is on providing a single point of control. In summary, a 'personal data store' always stores data whereas, whereas a personal data service may or may not.

== Examples ==
In AT Protocol, a Personal Data Server stores user data repositories and associated media.

The Locker Project was an open source, JavaScript-based, PDS with a centralized underlying attribute store that exists on a person's personal computer as well as an API to support local applications.

The Higgins project was an open-source project that included a personal data store and identity services.

Personal, Inc. was a consumer personal data service and identity management system for individuals.

Mydex is a commercial personal data store that became an identity provider for GOV.UK Verify.

== See also ==
- Data vault modeling
- Identity management
- Privacy by design
- Vendor relationship management
