= Con vos en la web =

Internet communication and information strategy

- Con Vos en la Web
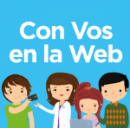
- Formation: 2012
- Type: Education, Computing, New Technologies, Computer Law
- Purpose: Education
- Headquarters: Av. España 2591
- Location: Argentina
- Region served: Buenos Aires
- Main organ: Politics of Argentina
- Parent organization: Sistema Argentino de Información Jurídica

Con Vos en la Web ("With you on the web") is a communication and information strategy on the safe use of the Internet. The program develops prevention contents and works on educating young people and their teachers on the responsible use of Information and Communication Technologies. It is a space for communication, advice and participation of children and teenagers on issues related to new technologies and the protection of personal data.

It was created in 2012 within the National Directorate for Personal Data Protection, an entity under the Ministry of Justice and Human Rights, during the office of Cristina Fernández de Kirchner as President and Julio Alak as Ministry of Justice On 2018, it was relocated to the National Directorate for the Argentine Legal Information System under the Ministry of Justice and Human Rights.

== Purpose ==
The purpose of Con Vos en la Web is to inform and promote good practices for the use of the Internet and to identify and reduce any risk factors intrinsic to the use of new technologies. To this end, the Program develops educational contents for children and their parents and teachers throughout the Argentine territory.

== Sources ==
- “Con Vos en la Web” official website
