= Geolocation Privacy and Surveillance Act =

United States federal bill

The Geolocation Privacy and Surveillance Act (GPS Act) was a bill introduced in the U.S. Congress in 2011 that attempted to limit government surveillance using geolocation information such as signals from GPS systems in mobile devices. The bill was sponsored by Sen. Ron Wyden and Rep. Jason Chaffetz. Since its initial proposal in June 2011, the GPS Act awaits consideration by the Senate Judiciary Committee as well as the House.

According to its proponents, the GPS Act sets forth "a legal framework designed to give government agencies, commercial entities and private citizens clear guidelines for when and how geolocation information can be accessed and used." Advocates drafted the bill to address controversies surrounding prior incidents in which police had attached GPS devices to suspects' vehicles without warrants and to set a legal precedent for such tracking in the future.

== History ==
Current legislation surrounding the issue of tracking an individual's location has proven to be legally ambiguous and technically outdated. To date, primary precedent draws from the 1983 ruling of United States v. Knotts (1983) and the contentious Electronic Communications Privacy Act of 1986. In that case the court ruled that electronic "beepers" could be fairly used to track a suspect's vehicle without warrant, because the suspect in that case had willingly taken the device that was used to track them. Justice Rehnquist delivered the majority opinion that the monitoring of such "beeper" devices did not invade any individual's "legitimate expectation of privacy". As a person traveling on public streets is visible to the naked eye, the practice was thus upheld as neither a "search" nor a "seizure" under Fourth Amendment definitions.

=== United States v. Jones ===
One notable incident of warrantless GPS tracking in 2005 led to United States v. Jones, decided by the United States Supreme Court. In Jones the police obtained a warrant to attach a GPS device to the underside of the defendant's car but then violated the warrant's scope in both geography and in length of time.

The Department of Justice (DOJ) defended the police's actions by contending that a warrant was unnecessary in the first place. It pointed to a two-decade precedent of warrantless GPS tracking. Roger L. Easton, the principal inventor of modern GPS technology, filed an amicus brief urging the court to renounce the DOJ's proposal. In reply, the U.S. Department of Justice argued that an individual has "no reasonable expectation of privacy" in his or her movements around public streets, and that legislation requiring certain standards for warrants would "severely impede" law enforcement officials in their work.

During oral argument, Justice Antonin Scalia suggested that legislatures could create restraints on law enforcement officers that would prevent such tracking.

The Supreme Court justices voted unanimously that the attachment of a GPS device on a vehicle and its monitoring, even on public streets, constituted a search under the Fourth Amendment. However, only four of the justices argued that the search violated reasonable expectations of privacy while the other five rested their conclusion on other grounds. The GPS Act would effectively endorse the minority's position and establish that geolocational searches are presumptively unreasonable. However, this ruling does not provide full protection from geolocational tracking methods, such as those used by telecommunication companies who reserve the right to collect geolocational information.

== Contents ==
If passed, the GPS Act would require probable cause and an accompanying warrant before government agencies could obtain private geolocational information on an individual, either through a mobile device or by the placement of a tracking bug. Taking a strong stance on consumer rights, the bill would further forbid private businesses from sharing customer location data without explicit consent of the individual. The bill would cover real-time tracking data as well as previously acquired historical location data.

The bill has set forth certain exceptions under which the acquisition of private tracking data by private or public entities would not be unlawful:

- As a response to theft, and for the purpose of tracking stolen merchandise
- As a personal safety net for children, as set forth by a parent or legal guardian
- In the case of emergency, where the individual has either personally requested assistance or is in known peril
- When the tracking information in question has been publicly broadcast

== Reception ==
=== Support ===
The bill was initially co-sponsored by Bob Goodlatte (R-VA), Chairman of the House Judiciary Subcommittee on Intellectual Property, Competition and the Internet. Since the bill's introduction, six other members of the House, as well as Senator Mark Kirk (R-IL). have signed on as co-sponsors.

The bill has also gained support from a variety of civil liberties organizations including the ACLU, CCIA, Competitive Enterprise Institute, Digital Liberty Organization, and Electronic Frontier Foundation.

Similar bills include one written by Senate Judiciary Chairman Patrick Leahy (D-VT), who aims to require a warrant to obtain GPS data from companies, and one by senators Al Franken (D-MN) and Richard Blumenthal (D-CT), who would require device manufacturers to receive explicit consent from the end-user before tracking their location.

In her concurrence in U.S. v Jones, Justice Sonia Sotomayor warned that the administration's defense of warrantless GPS tracking, if upheld, would allow federal agencies to track individuals through any cellular device, as law enforcement groups can also intercept signals the phones emit.

=== Opposition ===
The Obama Administration has expressed potential opposition to the GPS Act based on the belief that GPS tracking is no more invasive than visual surveillance.

== See also ==
- Information privacy
- Mass surveillance
- Mobile phone tracking
- Electronic Communications Privacy Act, 1986
- Katz v. United States (1967)
- Lane v. Facebook, Inc. (2010)
