= Article 29 Data Protection Working Party =

Independent EU advisory body on data protection

The Article 29 Working Party (Art. 29 WP), in full the Working Party on the Protection of Individuals with regard to the Processing of Personal Data, was an independent European Union advisory body on data protection and privacy. It was made up of a representative from the data protection authority of each EU Member State, the European Data Protection Supervisor and the European Commission.

The composition and purpose of Art. 29 WP was set out in Article 29 of the Data Protection Directive (Directive 95/46/EC), and it was launched in 1996. It was replaced by the European Data Protection Board (EDPB) on 25 May 2018 in accordance with the EU General Data Protection Regulation (GDPR) (Regulation (EU) 2016/679).

Its main stated missions were to:

- provide expert advice to the States regarding data protection;
- promote the consistent application of the Data Protection Directive in all EU state members, as well as Norway, Liechtenstein and Iceland;
- give to the Commission an opinion on community laws (first pillar) affecting the right to protection of personal data; and
- make recommendations to the public on matters relating to the protection of persons with regard to the processing of personal data and privacy in the European Community.

The Working Party elected a chairman and two vice-chairmen, each with a two-year term of office. Their term of office was renewable only once. The Working Party's secretariat was provided by the European Commission.

== See also ==
- Right to be forgotten
- EU–US Privacy Shield
