= Personal, Inc. =

Washington, D.C.-based tech startup

Personal, Inc. (now digi.me after 2017 merger)
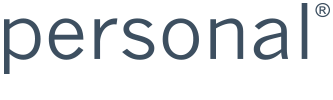
- Type: Private
- Industry: Internet
- Founded: 2009
- Headquarters: Washington, D.C., US and Farnham, United Kingdom

Personal (also referred to as Personal.com or Personal, Inc.) was a consumer personal data service and identity management system for individuals to aggregate, manage and reuse their own data. It merged with digi.me in August 2017, a business in Europe that has the same business model. The combined company is called digi.me. One of its product lines, a collaborative data management and information security solution for the workplace called TeamData, was spun off as a new company as a result of the merger.

== History ==
Personal was founded in 2009 in Washington, DC by the management team that built The Map Network, a location data and mapping platform that was acquired by Nokia/NAVTEQ in 2006. Personal was the first online consumer-facing company to be named an Ambassador for Privacy by Design for its technical, business and legal commitments to providing users with control over the data they store in Personal's service. Called a “life management platform” by The Economist and a “personal encrypted cloud service” by TIME for its user-centric approach to data, the company has been associated with both the Infomediary model originated in 1999 by John Hagel III and Mark Singer, as well as the vendor relationship management (VRM) model developed by Doc Searls. Personal raised $30m in funding to develop its platform and products from such leading investors as Steve Case's Revolution Ventures, Grotech Ventures, Allen & Company, Ted Leonsis, Neil Ashe, Jonathan Miller, Bill Miller of Legg Mason, Esther Dyson of EDventures, and Eric C. Anderson.

The company received recognition for its user agreement, called the Owner Data Agreement, which acted like a reverse license agreement when data was shared between registered parties and emphasized that data ownership resides with the user. Doc Searls wrote in The Intention Economy: When Customers Take Charge that the Owner Data Agreement “had no precedent and modeled a new legal position, both for vendors and for intermediaries.” Personal was early to embrace “small data,” which it defines as “big data for the benefit of individuals.” The term “small data” may have been originally coined by Jeremie Miller of Sing.ly, who mentioned it in a talk at the Web 2.0 Summit in November 2011 and is cited in The Intention Economy. In 2011, Personal was a part of the first group of companies to join the Personal Data Ecosystem Consortium's Startup Circle. A Small Data Meetup group has also formed in New York City, bringing together technology, legal and business experts to exchange ideas about user-centric and user-driven models for internet products and services. Personal has been included in case studies by Ctrl-Shift and Forrester regarding Personal Data Stores and Personal Identity Management.

In 2011, Personal received the Innovator Spotlight Award at Privacy Identity Innovation Conference (pii2011) and participated in the Technology Showcase at pii2012. In 2012, TechHive named Personal as one of the top five apps or web services of SXSW. Personal won the 2013 Campus Technology Innovators Award with Lone Star College in July 2013. Personal was included in a list of Executive Travel Magazine's favorite travel apps for 2013 in its May/June issue. In 2013, Personal was also included as part of NYU GovLab's Open Data 500 and was named by J. Walter Thompson as one of 100 things to watch for in 2014. In 2015, the National Law Journal named Company Chief Policy Officer and General Counsel, Joshua P. Galper, as one of their 50 "Cybersecurity & Privacy Trailblazers."

== Products and services ==
=== Overview ===
The Personal Platform was a privacy- and security-by-design platform for individuals to manage and reuse their own data and information. The Fill It app was a 1-click form-filling solution for web and mobile logins, checkouts and forms, and the Data Vault app served as the main cloud-based repository for a user's data. Personal helped individuals take control and benefit from their information while knowing that the information in their Data Vault remained legally theirs and could not be used without their permission.

=== Data Vault with Cloud Sync ===
Personal spent two years building the Personal Platform before launching its Data Vault product in beta in November 2011. Following Privacy by Design principles, Personal only enabled users to see or share the sensitive data and all the files they stored in their Data Vault. Such information was encrypted, and could only be decrypted with a user's password. Only users could choose and know their passwords to their vault because Personal did not store user passwords – and therefore could not reset them without deleting a user's sensitive data and all files stored in their vault. All Personal apps and services were linked to a user's private Data Vault.

The Data Vault featured automatic synchronization of data and files added on any device logged into Personal. It also featured a “Secure Share” function that created a live, private network, allowing registered users to share access to data and files through an exchange of encrypted keys without the risk of transmitting the data or files through non-secure, direct means. It also allowed users to immediately update data across their own network and revoke access to it when they choose. Fast Company called the Data Vault “a tool that will simplify our lives.”

Personal launched its Android app on November 30, 2011. The iOS Data Vault app was released on May 7, 2012. Personal officially launched its application programming interface (APIs) on October 2, 2012 at the Mashery Business of APIs Conference. A review by CNET highlighted the challenges of getting people to trust such a new service with their sensitive data and spending the time required entering enough data to make it useful.

=== Fill It App and Form Index ===
When the Data Vault was launched in November 2011, Mashable posed the question: “Never Fill Out a Form Again?” The World Economic Forum in its February 2013 report highlighted the possibility of saving 10 billion hours globally “and improv[ing] the delivery of public and private sector services” through automated form-filling tools, specifically citing Personal's Fill It app. In January 2013, Personal launched Fill It in beta as a web bookmarklet for automatic form-filling.

On June 11, 2014, Personal released Fill It as a web extension and announced that it was publishing an index of over 140,000 1-click online forms at www.fillit.com. The company also announced that a mobile version of the product will launch later in the year. According to a story in Tech Cocktail about the launch, Personal's “web extension and mobile app are able to support over 1,200 different types of reusable data, even enabling them to unlock more confidential information so they can complete longer forms, including patient registrations, job applications, event registrations, school admissions, insurance and bank applications, and government forms.” In November 2014, a mobile version of Fill It was launched that could autofill mobile forms using APIs.

Personal's form portal ultimately indexed more than 500,000 forms with three components, which, together, allowed data to be captured and reused across any of the forms: (1) a form graph, which mapped individual form fields to the Personal ontology; (2) a semantic layer, which determined how data was required on a form (e.g. one field vs. three fields for a U.S. telephone number); and (3) a correlations graph, which helped individuals match their specific data to a form without looking at the data value (e.g. knowing which phone number is a mobile phone number, which address is a billing address, or that a person uses their middle name as a first name on most forms).

=== Monetizing personal data ===
With the initial public offering of Facebook in May 2012, there was media interest in the question of the monetary value of personal data and whether tools and services might emerge to help consumers monetize their own data. Personal was frequently cited as a company that could potentially offer such a service. Articles and pieces focusing on this subject have appeared in The New York Times, AdWeek, the MIT Technology Review, and on CNN and National Public Radio. Company Co-founder and CEO Shane Green was quoted as saying that “the average American consumer would soon be able to realize over $1,000 per year” by granting limited, anonymous access to their data to marketers, but that figure was never supported by Green or the company.

=== Launch of TeamData ===
In May 2016, Personal shifted its product focus to TeamData, which focuses on the problem of securing and collaboratively managing data in the workplace. It is now a separate business.
