= Voluntary compliance =

Type of compliance

Voluntary compliance is conforming ("complying") to a rule, without facing negative consequences if not complying.

== In corporations ==
Voluntary compliance is one of possible ways of practicing corporate social responsibility. It is seen as an alternative to the state-imposed regulations on a company's behavior. Proponents of voluntary compliance argue that it is in a company's own interest to behave in a socially responsible manner and that in pursuit of good public image, the company will refrain from actions which could damage its perception by the public. Thus there is no need for state regulations.

On the other hand, opponents deem that companies may claim to voluntarily adhere to self-imposed regulations but in practice they often follow profit maximizing behavior, often violating stakeholders' interests. However, such behavior may be problematic not only morally or ethically but also legally: corporate codes of conduct may give rise to legal obligations pursuant to national laws of European Union member states implementing the Unfair Commercial Practices Directive or pursuant to consumer protection laws in other jurisdictions, including (subject to the effect of the federal and state constitutions) the states of the United States of America.

== U.S. taxation protests ==
In the United States, voluntary compliance may also refer to an argument made by tax protesters who suggest that payment of income tax is voluntary, and not legally enforceable. However, this argument is rejected by the Internal Revenue Service, and has not been accepted by the U.S. courts.

== See also ==
- Gentleman's agreement
