= European Data Protection Board =

EU body for implementing the GDPR

Coordinates: 50.8412578°N 4.3704363°E

Agency overview
- Formed: 18 May 2018; 8 years ago
- Type: body of the European Union
- Jurisdiction: European Union
- Headquarters: Rue Montoyer 30, 1000 Brussels, Belgium
- Employees: 47 (2025)
- Annual budget: €8.82 million (2025)
- Agency executive: Anu Talus (FI), Chair
- Key document: Regulation (EU) 2016/679 (GDPR)
- Website: edpb.europa.eu

The European Data Protection Board (EDPB) is a European Union independent body with juridical personality whose purpose is to ensure consistent application of the General Data Protection Regulation (GDPR) and to promote cooperation among the EU’s data protection authorities. On 25 May 2018, the EDPB replaced the Article 29 Working Party.

== Tasks ==
The EDPB remit includes issuing guidelines and recommendations, identifying best practices related to the interpretation and application of the GDPR, advising the European Commission on matters related to the protection of personal data in the European Economic Area (EEA), and adopting opinions to ensure the consistency of application of the GDPR by the national supervisory authorities, in particular on decisions having cross-border effects. Additionally, the EDPB is tasked with acting as a dispute resolution body in case of dispute between the national authorities cooperating on enforcement in the context of cross-border cases, encouraging the development of codes of conduct and establishing certification mechanisms in the field of data protection, and promoting cooperation and effective exchange of information and good practices among national supervisory authorities.

== Chairmanship ==
The European Data Protection Board is represented by its chair who is elected from the members of the board by simple majority for a five-year term, renewable once. The same election procedure and term of office apply to the two deputy chairs.

As of 2026, the chairmanship of the board consists of:

- Anu Talus, Chair
- Irene Loizidou Nicolaidou, Deputy Chair
- Zdravko Vukić, Deputy Chair

== Members ==
The board is composed of representatives of the 27 EU and 3 EEA EFTA national data protection authorities and the European Data Protection Supervisor (EDPS).
