= Peter Hustinx =

Dutch lawyer

Peter Johan Hustinx
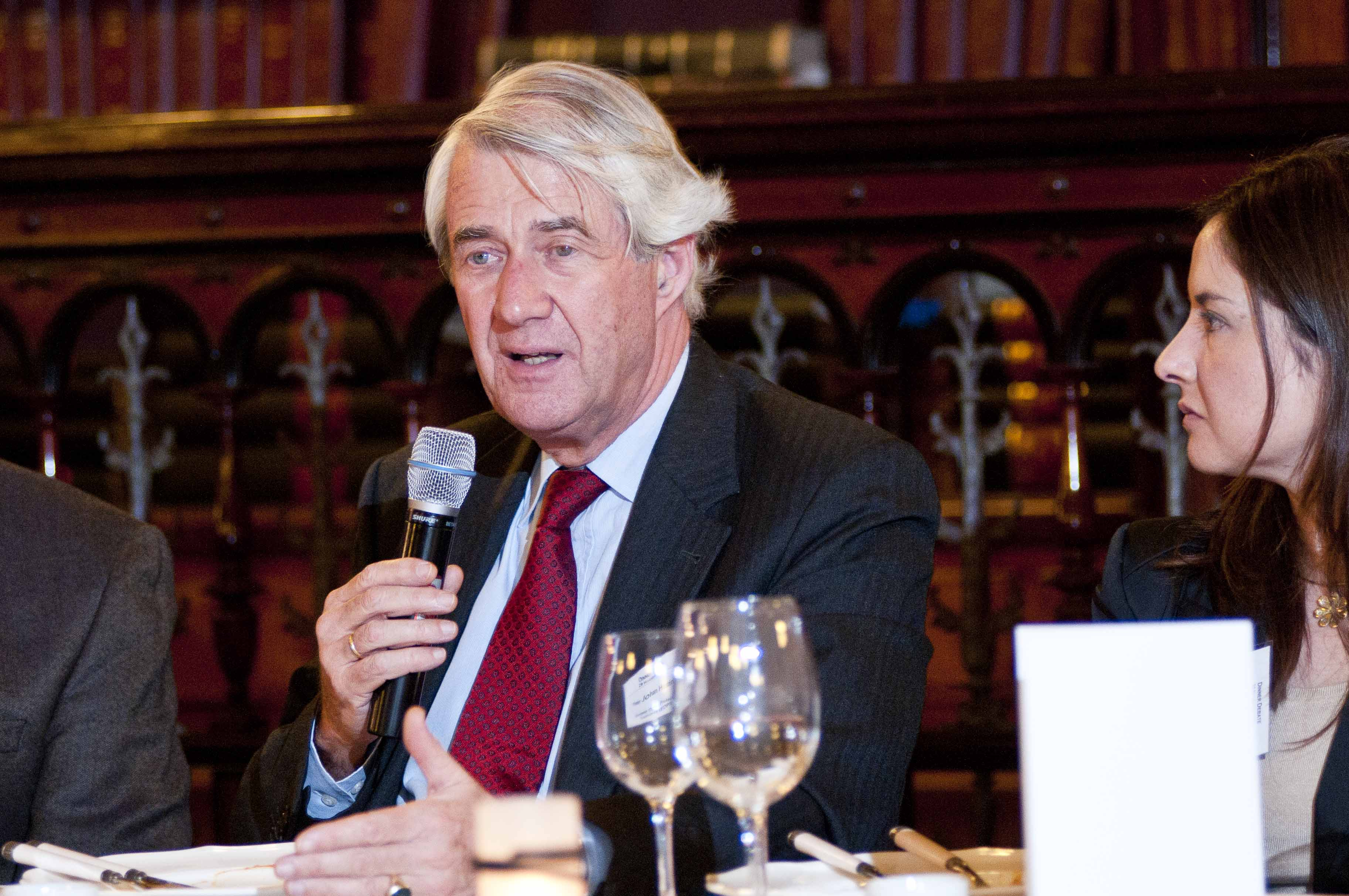

European Data Protection Supervisor
- In office January 2004 – December 2014
- Succeeded by: Giovanni Buttarelli

Personal details
- Born: 1945 Vught, Netherlands
- Education: University of Nijmegen University of Michigan Law School

Peter Johan Hustinx (born 1945) is a Dutch lawyer who served as European Data Protection Supervisor (EDPS) from January 2004 – 2014.

== Biography ==
=== Legal career ===
He trained at University of Nijmegen graduating in LLM in 1970, with further work at University of Michigan Law School.

From 1971 to 1991 he worked at the Dutch Ministry of Justice in constitutional and criminal law and preparing legislation.

He was general council of the public law division Dutch Ministry of Justice from 1979 to 1991.

In 1986 he became a Deputy judge at the Amsterdam Court of Appeal.

He chaired the appeals committee of Europol's supervisory body from 1998 to 2001 and was Chair of the commission for the control of Interpol's files from 2002 to 2009.

=== Data Protection ===
He started working on Data Protection as Deputy secretary-general from 1972-1976 of the Royal Commission on Privacy and Personal Data (Koopmans Commission)

He was a member of the 1981 Convention on Data Protection as part of his work from 1976 to 1991 Expert committee on Data Protection of the Council of Europe, and chaired this committee from 1985 to 1988.

He was President of the Dutch Data Protection Authority from 1991 to 2003, being reappointed twice in 1997 and 2001.

The chaired the EU Article 29 Data Protection working party from 1996 to 2000.

He was European Data Protection Supervisor (EDPS) from January 2004 to December 2014.

== Legacy ==
In an IAAP article on his legacy Dutch MEP Sophie in 't Veld was quoted "When he took office, data protection was a minor issue. Now, it's on top of the political agenda. So on his watch, the whole issue has changed dramatically." In the same article Hogan Lovells' Christopher Wolf described the EDPS as the "leading EU pundit on privacy and data security"

Government offices	European Data Protection Supervisor; 2004–2014	Succeeded by Giovanni Buttarelli
