= European Data Protection Supervisor =

Independent supervisory authority

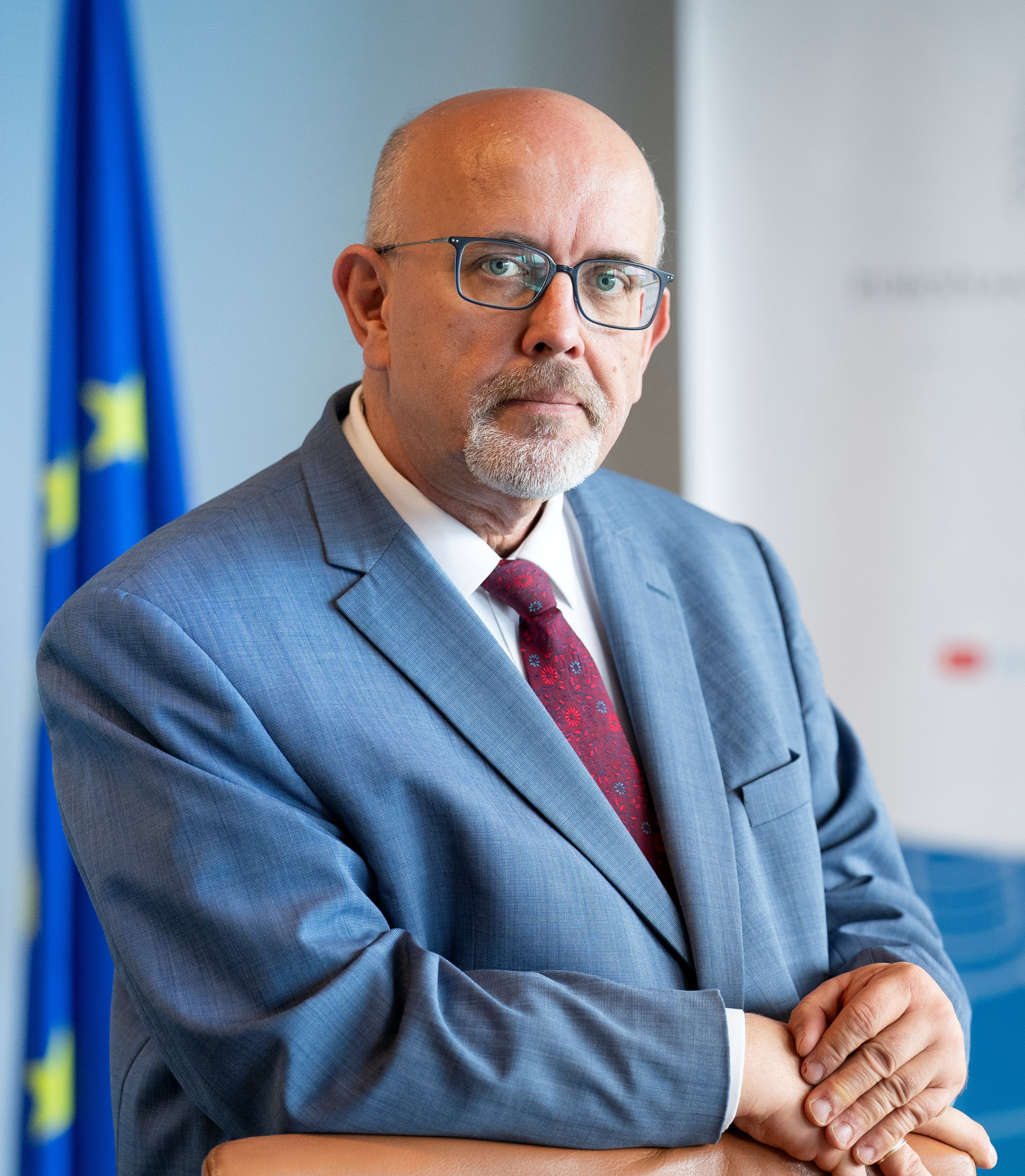
- Incumbent; Wojciech Wiewiórowski since 6 December 2019
- Nominator: European Commission
- Appointer: European Parliament and Council
- Constituting instrument: Regulation (EU) 2018/1725
- Formation: 17 January 2004
- First holder: Peter Hustinx
- Website: edps.europa.eu

The European Data Protection Supervisor (EDPS) is an independent supervisory authority whose primary objective is to monitor and ensure that European institutions and bodies respect the right to privacy and data protection when they process personal data and develop new policies.

Wojciech Wiewiórowski has been appointed European Data Protection Supervisor (EDPS) by a joint decision of the European Parliament and the Council. Appointed for a five-year term, he took office on 6 December 2019.

Regulation (EU) 2018/1725 describes the duties and powers of the European Data Protection Supervisor (Chapter VI) as well as the institutional independence of the EDPS as a supervisory authority. It also lays down the rules for data protection in the EU institutions.

== Activities ==
The duties and powers of the EDPS, as well as the institutional independence of the supervisory authority, are set out in the "Data Protection Regulation". In practice the EDPS' activities can be divided into three main roles: supervision, consultation, and cooperation. Under the Artificial Intelligence Act, it also serves as the competent supervisory and market surveillance authority, as well as the notified body, for EU institutions, bodies, offices and agencies that fall within the Act's scope.

=== Supervision ===
In the "supervisory" role the EDPS' core task is to monitor the processing of personal data in European institutions and bodies. The EDPS does so in cooperation with the data protection officers (DPO) present in each European institution and body. The DPO has to notify the EDPS about any processing operations involving sensitive personal data or likely to pose other specific risks. The EDPS then analyses this processing in relation to the Data Protection Regulation and issues a "prior check" opinion. In most cases, this exercise leads to a set of recommendations that the institution or body needs to implement so as to ensure compliance with data protection rules.

In 2009, for instance, the EDPS adopted more than a hundred prior check opinions, mainly covering issues such as health data, staff evaluation, recruitment, time management, telephone recording performance tools, and security investigations. These opinions are published on the EDPS website and their implementation is followed up systematically. For both 2022 and 2023 the EDPS adopted only a single opinion on a prior consultation.

The implementation of the Data Protection Regulation in the EU administration is also closely monitored by regular stock-taking of performance indicators, involving all EU institutions and bodies. In addition to this general monitoring exercise, the EDPS also carries out on-site inspections to measure compliance in practice.

The supervisory role of the EDPS also involves investigating complaints lodged by EU staff members or any other individual who feels that their personal data have been mishandled by a European institution or body. Examples of complaints include alleged violations of confidentiality, access to data, the right of rectification, erasure of data, and excessive collection or illegal use of data by the controller.

The EDPS has also developed other forms of supervision, such as advice on administrative measures and the drafting of thematic guidelines.

=== Consultation ===
In the "consultative" role the EDPS advises the European Commission, the European Parliament, and the Council of the European Union on data protection issues in a range of policy areas. This consultative role relates to proposals for new legislation as well as other initiatives that may affect personal data protection in the EU. It usually results in a formal opinion, but the EDPS may also provide guidance in the form of comments or policy papers. Technological developments having an impact on data protection are also monitored as part of this activity.

Some recent significant issues to which the EDPS has given special attention include international data transfers, internet governance, rebuilding trust between the EU and the US, eCommunications, cybersecurity, and the future of the area of freedom, security, and justice (Stockholm Programme).

The EDPS is also closely following the ongoing review of the legal framework for data protection aimed at modernising the Data Protection Directive in response to new globalisation and technological challenges. Realising this critical objective will be the dominant item on the EDPS' agenda over the coming years.

As part of his consultative role, the EDPS also intervenes in cases before the European Court of Justice that are relevant to his tasks. In June 2009 for instance, he intervened in a case concerning the relationship between transparency and data protection – the so-called "Bavarian Lager" case.

=== Cooperation ===
The EDPS cooperates with other data protection authorities in order to promote a consistent approach to data protection throughout Europe.

The main platform for cooperation between data protection authorities in Europe is the Article 29 Data Protection Working Party. The EDPS takes part in the activities of the Working Party, which plays an important role in the uniform application of the Data Protection Directive and the superseding General Data Protection Regulation (GDPR). The EDPS and the Working Party have cooperated effectively on a range of subjects, but particularly on the implementation of the Data Protection Directive and on the challenges raised by new technologies. The EDPS also strongly supported initiatives taken to ensure that international data flows respect European data protection principles

One of the most important cooperative tasks of the EDPS involves Eurodac where the responsibilities for supervision are shared with national data protection authorities.

The EDPS cooperates with data protection authorities in the former "third pillar" – the area of police and judicial cooperation – and with the Working Party on Police and Justice.

Cooperation also takes place through participation in two major annual data protection conferences: a European Conference that gathers data protection authorities from the EU Member States and the Council of Europe, and an International conference attended by a wide range of data protection experts, both from the public and private sectors.

== List of European Data Protection Supervisors ==
Term	European Data Protection Supervisor	Assistant Supervisor
2004–2009	Peter Hustinx	Joaquín Bayo Delgado
2009–2014	Peter Hustinx	Giovanni Buttarelli
2014–2019	Giovanni Buttarelli	Wojciech Wiewiórowski
2019–	Wojciech Wiewiórowski	Post discontinued

== See also ==
- Article 29 Data Protection Working Party
