= Turkish Data Protection Authority =

- KVKK; Kişisel Verileri Koruma Kurumu

Agency overview
- Formed: January 30, 2017
- Headquarters: Nasuh Akar Mah. 1407. Sokak, No:4, Çankaya, Ankara, Turkey
- Website: kvkk.gov.tr

The Turkish Data Protection Authority (Turkish: Kişisel Verileri Koruma Kurumu, KVKK) is a government organization in Turkey which provides the protection of personal data and works to develop awareness in this respect in the public eye in line with the fundamental rights related with privacy and freedom stated in the Constitution. Turkish Data Protection Authority was established under the Law on the Protection of Personal Data No. 6698 published in 2016.
