= Dato Capital =

Online database of business information

- Available in: English, Spanish
- Headquarters: {{{location_country}}}
- Country of origin: Spain
- Parent: Netamo Systems SL
- Website: en.datocapital.com
- Commercial: yes
- Registration: Not required
- Launched: 2007; 19 years ago

Dato Capital is an online database of business information about companies and directors registered in the United Kingdom, Gibraltar, Spain, Panama, Cayman Islands, Luxembourg and British Virgin Islands.

== Overview ==
The website publishes basic company and director information but complete reports are priced. The amount of available information about a company varies depending on the country of incorporation, ranging from financial data (UK companies) to just company name and type (Cayman Islands and BVI). Basic information about directors includes approximate figures of the number and location of the companies involved and an extract of the appointment list. Not all the countries have director data.

The parent company who owns the database and website is Netamo Systems SL, incorporated in Spain.

The company received attention in October 2014 when it published lists of deleted director profile links under the Right to be forgotten directive.

== History ==
According to the parent company, it was incorporated in 2001; started working in business applications in 2003, and website was launched in 2007. The first proof of datocapital.com existence dates to December 2008, and it shows a Spanish version with only Spanish companies. Domain was registered in September 2006. The first press mention of UK companies was in March 2014, and Gibraltar and Panama appear in another interview of March 2015. Latter countries were introduced during 2015.

== Business Model ==
The company acts an information reseller, collecting data from public sources such as gazettes and official corporate registries; and private sources such as banks and credit agencies. Some of the data is published in the company website with an advertising model, and the rest of the data is sold in a paid content model. There is no registration available.

=== Controversy with data aggregators ===
The role of data aggregators has been criticized since 1995 with privacy, and data accuracy as main concerns. Most negative views against data aggregators are based on the use of personal email addresses and details, but since the company publishes company director names, it may be considered personal data as well.

== Right to be forgotten ==
Starting June 2014, Google started removing links to director profiles of the United Kingdom and Spain on the website, and the company published a daily updated list with deleted links for each country as a response.

The company claims that business information is exempted from privacy laws, and that their users have the right to access business information all across the world.

An article by Roger Parloff was published in Fortune Magazine covering the story, citing 110 removed links, 64 from UK directors and 56 from Spanish directors (in September 2015, the website lists 174 links, 100 from the UK and 74 from Spain). Jimmy Wales quoted the article in a tweet, saying I told you so. Where is our right to remember?" Another an article was published in WSJ Blogs from Jason Wright, managing director of risk consulting firm Kroll Inc., citing the previous story and stating that "For investors, the “right to be forgotten” could become the right to be defrauded."

=== Criticism ===
The Fortune Magazine article also included opposing views from Viktor Mayer-Schönberger, who stated that "My name is personal information. So I, as an individual, can object to somebody else processing that information if that somebody does not perform a media function."

== Press Source ==
The database is used as a source in business articles and researches involving international corporate conglomerates, high net worth individuals and statistical corporate data: Examples include: IMF former chief Rodrigo Rato, Rafael del Pino, Enrique Bañuelos, House of Bourbon, Aceralia CEO Aristrain, SICAV companies, banning solicitors, Fon, cross-border incorporations, Traian Basescu, Haarlem (Netherlands) Aldermen Ewout Cassee

The company participates in the OffshoreAlert conference run by David Marchant., and it appears in the Spanish Government study of the Infomediary sector.

== Competition ==
Dato Capital's competitors include services such as Bureau van Dijk, Duedil, Hoovers and Dun & Bradstreet.

== See also ==
- OpenCorporates
- ZoomInfo
- Intelius
- InsideView
