= CPRA =

CPRA may refer to:

- Central progressive retinal atrophy, a type of progressive retinal atrophy (eye problem)
- California Privacy Rights Act, a privacy and data protection law
- California Public Records Act, a freedom-of-information law
- Canadian Professional Rodeo Association, Canadian governing body of professional rodeo
- Louisiana Coastal Protection and Restoration Authority, an environmental authority with jurisdiction over Louisiana's coastal region
