= Governorship of Gavin Newsom =

Events of California governorship since 2019

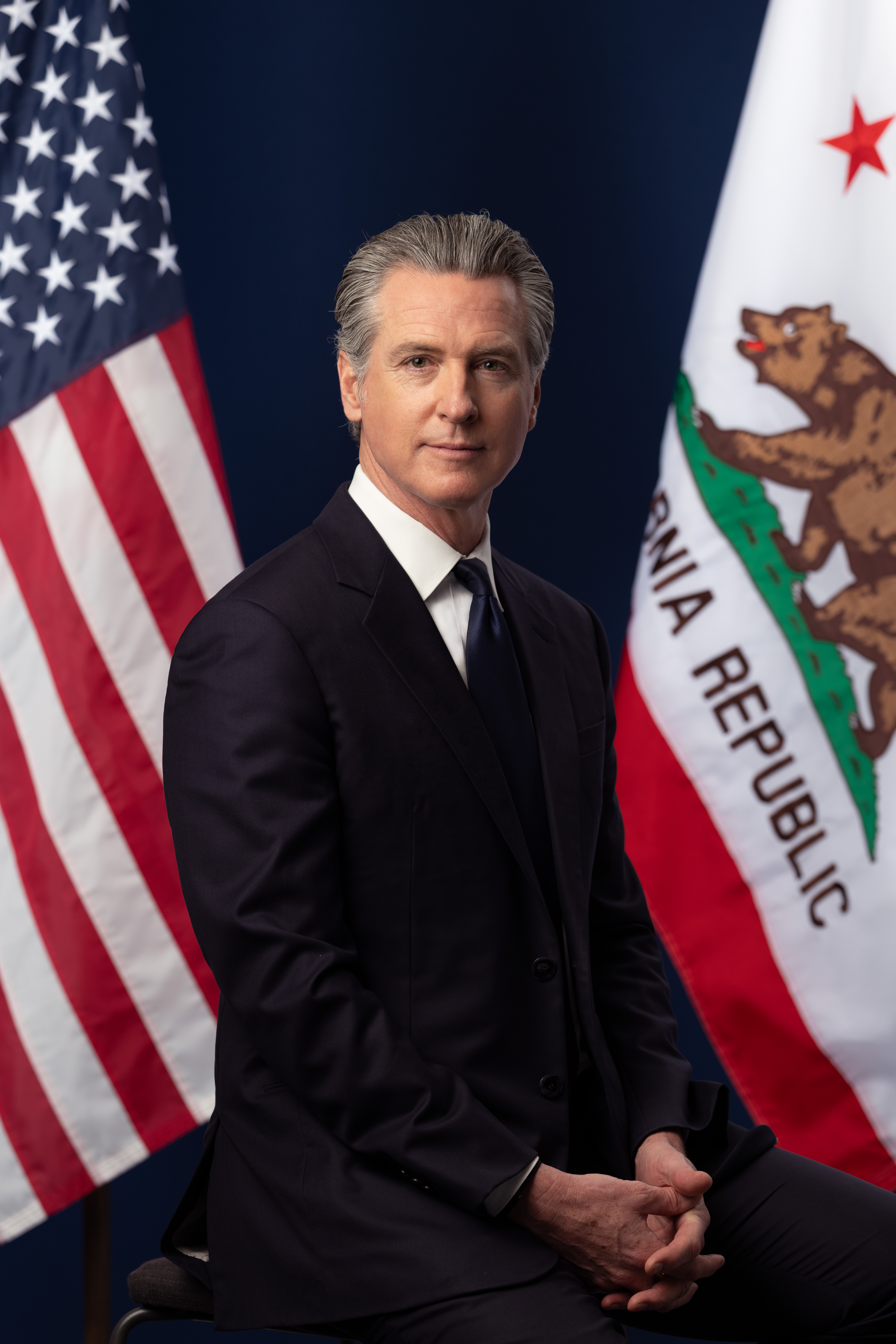
- Governorship of Gavin Newsom; January 7, 2019 – present
- Governor: Gavin Newsom
- Party: Democratic
- Election: 2018, 2021 (recall), 2022
- Seat: Governor's Mansion

Gavin Newsom has served as governor of California since 2019. First elected in 2018, he survived a 2021 recall election and was re-elected to a second term in 2022. Given the state of California's constitution has a two term limit for the governorship, he cannot pursue an additional term.

== Gubernatorial elections ==
Results of the 2018 California gubernatorial election; Newsom won the counties in blue

Results of the 2021 California gubernatorial recall election; No on recall won the counties in yellowish-brown khaki colors

Results of the 2022 California gubernatorial election; Newsom won the counties in blue

=== 2010 lieutenant gubernatorial election ===
On April 21, 2009, Newsom announced his candidacy for governor of California in the 2010 election. He named state senator (and future U.S. senator) Alex Padilla to chair his campaign. He received former president Bill Clinton's endorsement in September. Throughout the campaign, he had low poll numbers, trailing Democratic frontrunner Jerry Brown by more than 20 points in most polls. Newsom dropped out of the race in October and ran for lieutenant governor instead.

Newsom, who was the Mayor of San Francisco, defeated the Incumbent Republican lieutenant governor Abel Maldonado in the 2010 elections. Newsom started his four-year term as the lieutenant governor of California on January 10, 2011.

=== 2018 gubernatorial election ===
On February 11, 2015, Newsom announced that he was opening a campaign account for governor in the 2018 elections, allowing him to raise funds for a campaign to succeed Brown as governor of California. On June 5, 2018, he finished in the top two in the nonpartisan blanket primary, and he defeated Republican John H. Cox by a landslide in the November 6 general election.

Newsom was sworn in on January 7, 2019.

=== 2021 recall election ===
Several recall attempts were launched against Newsom early in his tenure, but they failed to gain much traction. On February 21, 2020, a recall petition was introduced by Orrin Heatlie, a deputy sheriff in Yolo County. The petition mentioned Newsom's sanctuary state policy and said laws he endorsed favored "foreign nationals, in our country illegally"; said that California had high homelessness, high taxes, and low quality of life; and described other grievances. The California secretary of state approved it for circulation on June 10, 2020.

Forcing the gubernatorial recall election required a total of 1,495,709 verified signatures. By August 2020, 55,000 signatures were submitted and verified by the secretary of state, and 890 new valid signatures were submitted by October 2020. The petition was initially given a signature deadline of November 17, 2020, but it was extended to March 17, 2021, after Judge James P. Arguelles ruled that petitioners could have more time because of the pandemic. Newsom's attendance at a party at The French Laundry in November 2020, despite his public health measures; voter anger over lockdowns, job losses, school and business closures; and a $31 billion fraud scandal at the state unemployment agency were credited for the recall's growing support. The French Laundry event took place on November 6, and between November 5 and December 7 over 442,000 new signatures were submitted and verified; 1,664,010 verified signatures, representing roughly 98% of the final total of 1,719,900, were submitted between November 2020 and March 17, 2021.

During the campaign, Newsom compared the recall effort to the attempts to overturn the 2020 United States presidential election. On September 14, 2021, the recall election was held, and only 38% voted to recall Newsom, so he remained in office.

=== 2022 gubernatorial election ===
In 2022, Newsom was elected to a second term, defeating Republican state senator Brian Dahle with 59.2% of the vote. This was a smaller margin of victory than in 2018, and the first time since 2010 that the Democratic gubernatorial nominee did not win at least 60% of the vote.

== Analysis ==
A CalMatters analysis published in 2019 found Newsom's political positions to be more moderate than those of almost every Democratic state legislator in California.

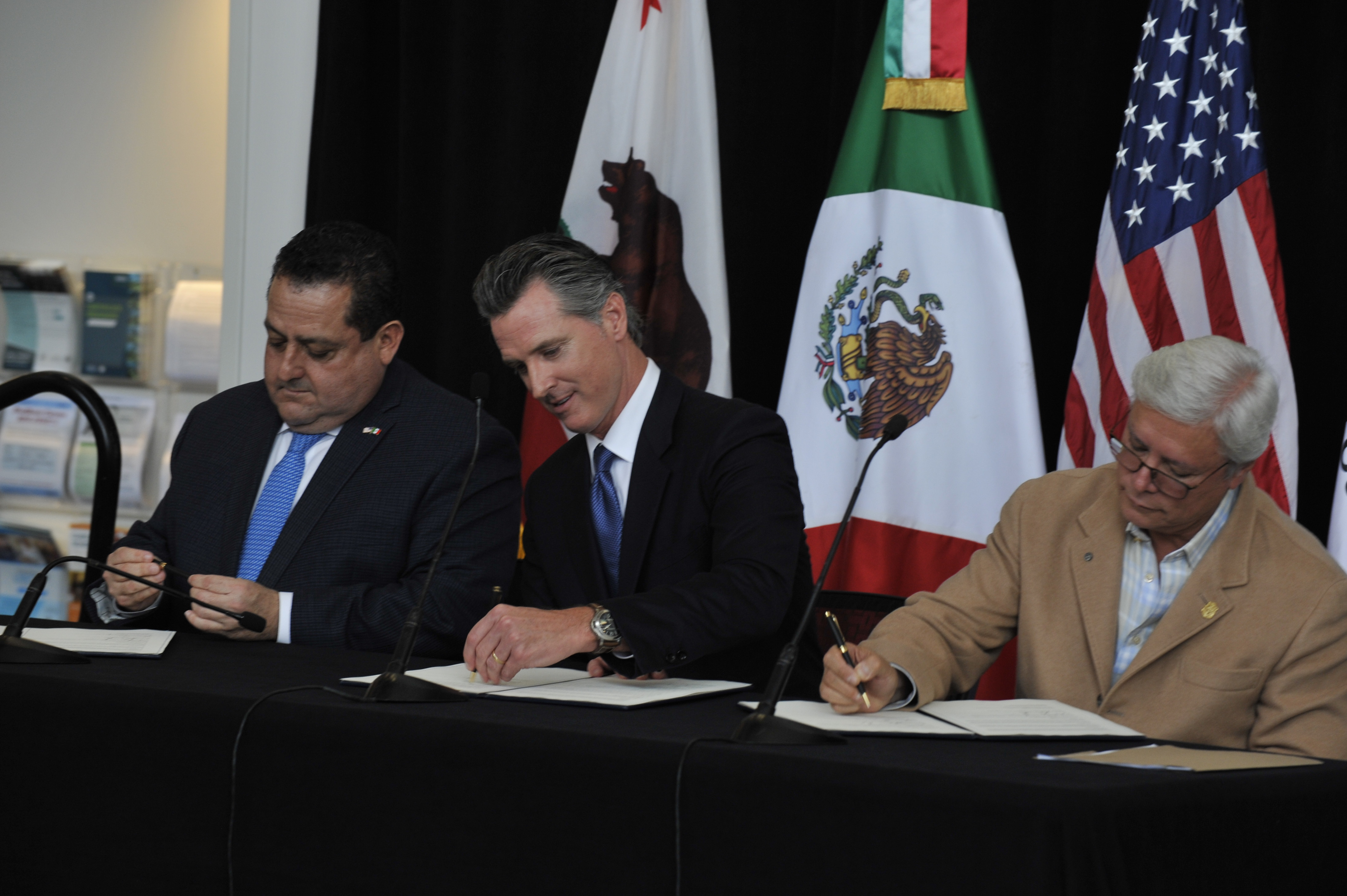
Ceremony for the reestablishment of the Commission of the Californias in 2019. Pictured are Governor Jaime Bonilla Valdez of Baja California (left), Governor Gavin Newsom of California (center), and Governor Carlos Mendoza Davis of Baja California Sur (right).

== Appointments ==
After U.S. senator Kamala Harris was elected vice president of the United States in the 2020 presidential election, Newsom appointed Secretary of State of California Alex Padilla to succeed her as California's junior U.S. senator. To replace Padilla as secretary of state, Newsom appointed Assemblywoman Shirley Weber. After the U.S. Senate confirmed Xavier Becerra as U.S. Secretary of Health and Human Services, Newsom appointed Rob Bonta Attorney General of California. In an interview with Joy Reid, Newsom was asked whether he would appoint a Black woman to replace Dianne Feinstein if she were to retire from the Senate or die before her term ended in 2024; Newsom replied that he would. Feinstein died in September 2023, and Newsom faced pressure to quickly appoint a successor. He fulfilled his promise and appointed Laphonza Butler to the seat.

== Political disagreements with Donald Trump ==
Newsom and Donald Trump have had a prolonged dispute over governance in California and federal policy. Trump has repeatedly criticized Newsom's handling of wildfires, immigration policies, and the general administration of the state, often using derogatory language. In response, Newsom has made sharply critical statements on social media, including personal insults aimed at Trump in 2025 and 2026.

After Donald Trump on the 2024 presidential election, Newsom called for California lawmakers to convene later in 2024 to safeguard California's policies from the upcoming second Trump administration.

== Criminal justice ==
=== Capital punishment ===
On March 13, 2019, three years after voters narrowly rejected its repeal, Newsom declared a moratorium on the state's death penalty, preventing any execution in the state as long as he remained governor. The move also led to the withdrawal of the state's current lethal injection protocol and the execution chamber's closure at San Quentin State Prison. In a CBS This Morning interview, Newsom said that the death penalty is "a racist system ... that is perpetuating inequality. It's a system that I cannot in good conscience support." The moratorium granted a temporary reprieve for all 737 inmates on California's death row, then the largest death row in the Western Hemisphere.

In January 2022, Newsom directed the state to begin dismantling its death row in San Quentin, to be transformed into a "space for rehabilitation programs", as all the condemned inmates are moving to other prisons that have maximum security facilities. The state's voters upheld capital punishment in 2012 and 2016, with the latter measure agreeing to move the condemned to other prisons. While a 2021 poll by the UC Berkeley Institute of Governmental Studies and co-sponsored by the Los Angeles Times suggested declining support for capital punishment among California's voters, Republican opponents criticized Newsom's moves to halt capital punishment in California as defiance of the will of voters, and capital punishment advocates said they denied closure to murder victims' families.

=== Clemency ===
In response to the Trump administration's crackdown on immigrants with criminal records, Newsom gave heightened consideration to people in this situation. A pardon can eliminate the grounds for deportation of immigrants who would otherwise be legal permanent residents. Pardon requests from people facing deportation are given expedited review by the state Board of Parole Hearings, per a 2018 California law. In his first acts of clemency as governor, Newsom pardoned seven formerly incarcerated people in May 2019, including two Cambodian refugees facing deportation. He pardoned three men who were attempting to avoid being deported to Cambodia or Vietnam in November 2019. They had separately committed crimes when they were each 19 years old. In December 2019, Newsom granted parole to a Cambodian refugee who had been held in a California prison due to a murder case. Although immigrant rights groups wanted Newsom to end policies allowing the transfer to federal agents, the refugee was turned over for possible deportation upon release.

On January 13, 2022, Newsom denied parole to Sirhan Sirhan, Robert F. Kennedy's assassin, who had been recommended for parole by a parole board after serving 53 years in prison. Newsom wrote an op-ed for the Los Angeles Times saying Sirhan "still lacks the insight that would prevent him from making the kind of dangerous and destructive decisions he made in the past. The most glaring proof of Sirhan's deficient insight is his shifting narrative about his assassination of Kennedy, and his current refusal to accept responsibility for it."

=== Police reform ===
Newsom has spoken in favor of Assembly Bill 1196, which would ban carotid artery restraints and choke holds in California. He has claimed that there is no longer a place for a policing tactic "that literally is designed to stop people's blood from flowing into their brain, that has no place any longer in 21st-century practices."

In September 2021, Newsom signed legislation raising the minimum age to become a police officer from 18 to 21. Also in the bills were restrictions on the use of tear gas and a ban on police departments employing officers after misconduct or crimes. Among the bills was the George Floyd Bill, requiring officers to intervene when witnessing excessive force on the part of another officer.

=== Transgender prisoners ===
In September 2020, Newsom signed into law a bill allowing California transgender inmates to be placed in prisons that correspond with their gender identity. An inmate's request can be denied based on "management or security concerns". In response, the Women's Liberation Front filed a lawsuit claiming that the bill is "unconstitutional and creates an unsafe environment for women in female facilities".

== Disasters and emergencies ==
=== COVID-19 pandemic ===
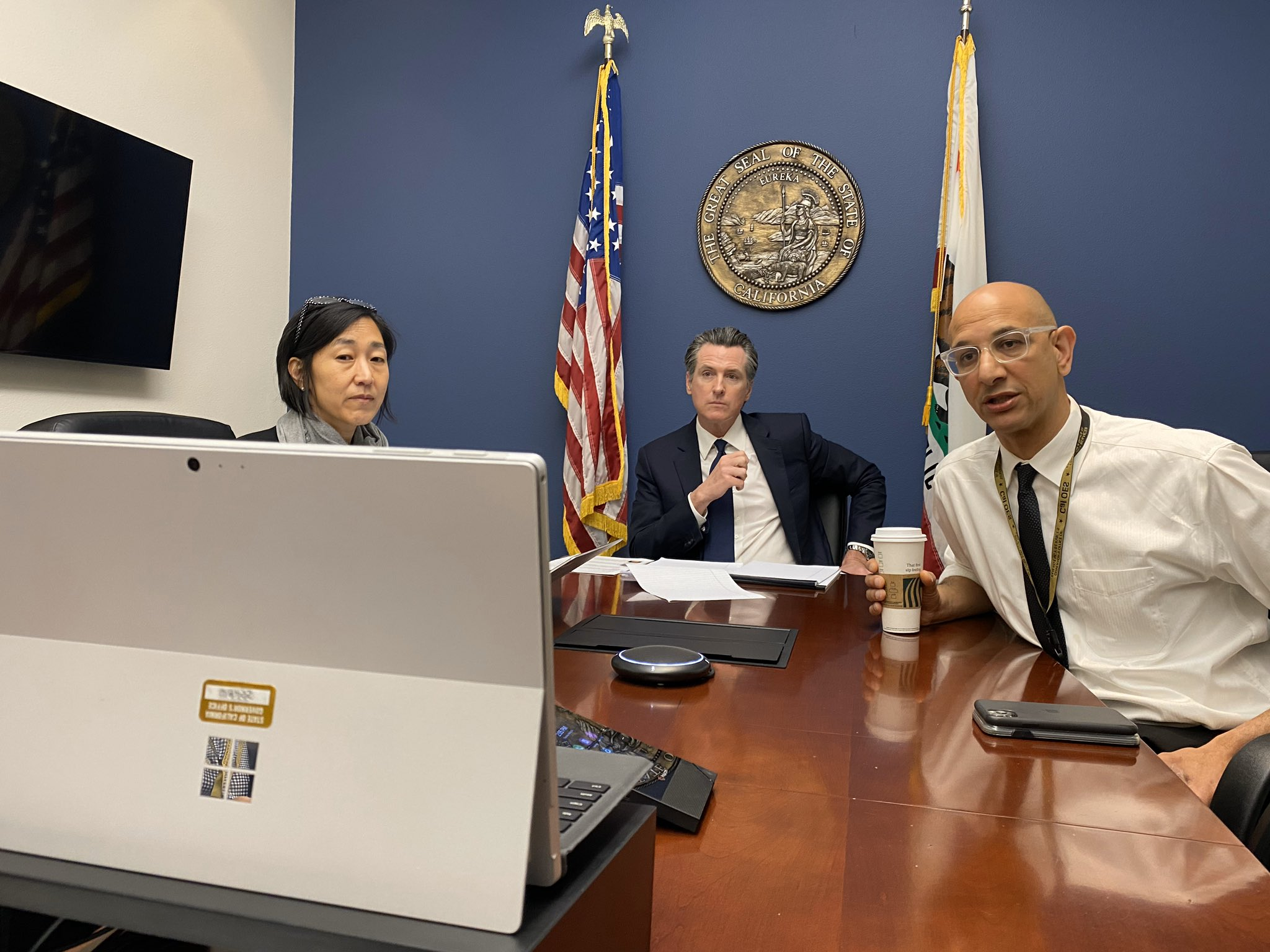
Newsom meets with health officials on the COVID-19 pandemic, March 2020.

Newsom declared a state of emergency on March 4, 2020, after the first death in California attributable to the novel SARS-CoV-2 coronavirus disease (COVID-19). His stated intention was to help California prepare for and contain COVID-19's spread. The emergency declaration allowed state agencies to more easily procure equipment and services, share information on patients and alleviated restrictions on the use of state-owned properties and facilities. Newsom also announced that mitigation policies for the state's estimated 108,000 unsheltered homeless people would be prioritized, with a significant push to move them indoors.

Newsom issued an executive order that allowed the state to commandeer hotels and medical facilities to treat COVID-19 patients and permitted government officials to hold teleconferences in private without violating open meeting laws. He also directed local school districts to make their own decisions on school closures, but used an executive order to ensure students' needs would be met whether or not their school was physically open. The U.S. Department of Agriculture approved the Newsom administration's request to offer meal service during school closures, which included families being able to pick up those meals at libraries, parks, or other off-campus locations. Roughly 80% of students at California's public schools receive free or reduced-price meals. This executive order included continued funding for remote learning opportunities and child care options during workday hours.

As the number of confirmed COVID-19 cases in the state continued to rise, on March 15, Newsom urged people 65 and older and those with chronic health conditions to isolate themselves from others. He also called on bars and brewery and winery tasting rooms to close their doors to patrons. Some local jurisdictions had mandatory closures. The closures were extended to movie theaters and health clubs. He asked restaurants to stop serving meals inside their establishments and offer take-out meals only. His statewide order to stay at home became mandatory on March 19. It allowed movement outside the home for necessities or recreation, but people were required to maintain a safe distance apart. Activity "needed to maintain continuity of operation of the federal critical infrastructure sectors, critical government services, schools, childcare, and construction" was excluded from the order. Essential services such as grocery stores and pharmacies remained open. Newsom provided state funds to pay for protective measures such as hotel room lodging for hospital and other essential workers fearing returning home and infecting family members. By April 26, he had issued 30 executive orders under the state of emergency while the legislature had not been in session.

On April 28, Newsom, along with the governors of Oregon and Washington, announced a "shared approach" for reopening their economies. His administration outlined key indicators for altering his stay-at-home mandate, including the ability to closely monitor and track potential cases, prevent infection of high-risk people, increase surge capacity at hospitals, develop therapeutics, ensure physical distancing at schools, businesses, and child-care facilities, and develop guidelines for restoring isolation orders if the virus surges. The plan to end the shutdown had four phases. Newsom emphasized that easing restrictions would be based on data, not dates, saying, "We will base reopening plans on facts and data, not on ideology. Not what we want. Not what we hope." Of a return of Major League Baseball and the NFL, he said, "I would move very cautiously in that expectation."

In early May, Newsom announced that certain retailers could reopen for pickup. Most Californians approved of Newsom's handling of the crisis and were more concerned about reopening too early than too late, but there were demonstrations and protests against these policies. Under pressure, Newsom delegated more decision-making on reopening to the local level. That same month, he announced a plan for registered voters to have the option to vote by mail in the November election. California was the first state in the country to commit to sending mail-in ballots to all registered voters for the November general election.

As the state opened up, the Los Angeles Times found that new coronavirus hospitalizations in California began accelerating around June 15 at a rate not seen since early April, immediately after the virus began rapidly spreading in the state. On June 18, Newsom made face coverings mandatory for all Californians in an effort to reduce COVID-19's spread. Enforcement would be up to business owners, as local law enforcement agencies view non-compliance as a minor infraction. By the end of June, he had ordered seven counties to close bars and nightspots, and recommended eight other counties take action on their own to close those businesses due to a surge of coronavirus cases in some parts of the state. In a regular press conference on July 13 as he was ordering the reinstatement of the shutdown of bars and indoor dining in restaurants, he said, "We're seeing an increase in the spread of the virus, so that's why it's incumbent upon all of us to recognize soberly that COVID-19 is not going away any time soon until there is a vaccine or an effective therapy".

Newsom oversaw a sluggish initial rollout of vaccines; California had one of the lowest vaccination rates in the country by January 2021, and had only used about 30% of the vaccines it had at its disposal, a far lower rate than other states, by January 20. Newsom had an approval rating of 64% in September 2020, but a February 2021 UC Berkeley Institute of Governmental Studies poll found that his approval rate was down to 46%, with 48% disapproval, the highest of his tenure. The Los Angeles Times attributed this decline to public opinion of his management of the pandemic. The vaccination rate began increasing in January, with over half the population fully vaccinated as of September 2021, the percentage ranking #16 out of the 50 states.

Although the Newsom administration enacted some of the country's most stringent pandemic restrictions in 2020, California had the 29th-highest death rate of all 50 states by May 2021. Monica Gandhi, a professor of medicine at UCSF, said that California's restrictive approach "did not lead to better health outcomes", and criticized California's delay in implementing new CDC recommendations absolving the fully vaccinated from most indoor mask requirements, while saying the decision lacked scientific rationale and could cause "collateral damage".

=== Pandemic unemployment fraud and debt ===
In January 2021, the Los Angeles Times reported that Newsom's administration had mismanaged $11.4 billion by disbursing unemployment benefits to ineligible claimants, especially those paid through the federally funded Pandemic Unemployment Assistance program. Another $19 billion in claims remained under investigation for fraud. At the same time, legitimate claimants faced lengthy delays in receiving benefits. The state's unemployment system had been overseen by California Labor Secretary Julie Su, a Newsom appointee, whom President Joe Biden later appointed as deputy secretary of labor in February 2021.

Political opponents attributed the crisis to the Newsom administration's failure to heed multiple warnings by federal officials of the potential for fraud, while Newsom's administration said the Trump administration's failure to provide appropriate guidance for the new federally funded program contributed to the fraud. Experts said much of the fraud appeared to originate from international criminal gangs in 20 countries. A report by California State Auditor Elaine Howle said $810 million was disbursed to claimants who had fraudulently filed on behalf of inmates in the state's prison system.

According to The Sacramento Bee, by the summer of 2021, California owed $23 billion to the federal government for unemployment benefits paid out during the pandemic, which was 43% of all unemployment debt, owed by 13 states at the time, to the federal government. Most of this debt was unrelated to the federally funded pandemic unemployment programs that had experienced most of the fraud, and instead was due to longstanding underfunding and California's high rate of unemployment during the pandemic.

=== Wildfires ===
Due to a mass die-off of trees throughout California that could increase the risk of wildfires, Newsom declared a state of emergency on March 22, 2020, in preparation for the 2020 wildfire season. After declaring a state of emergency on August 18, he reported that the state was battling 367 known fires, many sparked by intense thunderstorms on August 16–17. His request for assistance via issuance of a federal disaster declaration in the wake of six major wildfires was first rejected by the Trump administration, but accepted after Trump spoke to Newsom.

On June 23, 2021, the NPR station CapRadio reported that Newsom and Cal Fire had falsely claimed in January 2020 that 90,000 acres (36,000 ha) of land at risk for wildfires had been treated with fuel breaks and prescribed burns; the actual treated area was 11,399 acres (4,613 ha), an overstatement of 690%. According to CapRadio, the fuel breaks of the 35 "priority projects" Newsom had touted, which were meant to ensure the quick evacuation of residents while preventing traffic jams and a repeat of events in the 2018 fire that destroyed the town of Paradise, where at least eight evacuees burned to death in their vehicles, were struggling to mitigate fire spread in almost every instance while failing to prevent evacuation traffic jams. The same day CapRadio revealed the oversight, leaked emails showed that Newsom's handpicked Cal Fire chief had ordered the removal of the original statement. In another report in April 2022, CapRadio found a program, hailed in 2020 by the Newsom administration to fast-track environmental reviews on high-priority fire prevention projects, had failed to make progress.

KXTV released a series of reports chronicling PG&E's liabilities after committing 91 felonies in the Santa Rosa and Paradise fires. Newsom was accused of accepting campaign donations from PG&E in order to change the CPUC's ruling on PG&E's safety license. The rating change allowed PG&E to avoid billions of dollars in extra fees. Newsom was also accused of setting up the Wildfire Insurance Fund via AB 1054, using ratepayer fees, so PG&E could avoid financial losses and pass the liability costs to ratepayers and taxpayers.

=== June 2025 Los Angeles protests ===
In June 2025, protests broke out in Los Angeles after a series of federal immigration raids. As demonstrations continued, President Trump issued a memorandum federalizing up to 4,000 California National Guard troops and deploying U.S. Marines to assist with the response. Newsom objected, calling it an unconstitutional overreach of federal authority. On June 9, the State of California, led by Newsom, filed a federal lawsuit, Newsom v. Trump, challenging the legality of the troop deployment. The complaint argued that the order exceeded the president's statutory powers under 10 U.S.C. § 252 and violated the Tenth Amendment and the Posse Comitatus Act.

== Energy and environment ==
Newsom talks about climate change at North Complex Fire, September 2020.

Upon taking office in 2019, Newsom succeeded Brown as co-chair of the United States Climate Alliance. In September 2019, Newsom vetoed SB 1, which would have preserved environmental protections at the state level that were set to roll back nationally under the Trump administration's environmental policy. In February 2020, the Newsom administration sued federal agencies over the rollbacks to protect imperiled fish in the Sacramento–San Joaquin River Delta in 2019.

Newsom attended the 2019 UN Climate Action Summit, where he spoke of California as a climate leader due to the actions of governors before him. In August 2020, he addressed the 2020 Democratic National Convention. His speech mentioned climate change and the wildfires prevalent in California at the time. On September 23, 2020, Newsom signed an executive order to phase out sales of gasoline-powered vehicles and require all new passenger vehicles sold in the state to be zero-emission by 2035. Bills he signed in September with an environmental focus included a commission to study lithium extraction around the Salton Sea.

During his 2018 campaign, Newsom pledged to tighten state oversight of fracking and oil extraction. Early in his governorship, his administration approved new oil and gas leases on public lands at about twice the rate of the prior year. When asked about this development, Newsom said he was unaware of the rate of approvals, and he later fired the head of the Division of Oil, Gas and Geothermal Resources. In November 2019, he imposed a moratorium on approval of new hydraulic fracturing and steam-injected oil drilling in the state until the permits for those projects could be reviewed by an independent panel of scientists. State agencies resumed issuing new hydraulic fracturing permits in April 2020. In 2021, the Center for Biological Diversity sued the Newsom administration over the continued sale of oil and gas leases, and Consumer Watchdog called for the end of their sale. In April 2021, Newsom committed to ending the sale of gas leases by 2024 and ending oil extraction by 2045. In October 2021, he proposed a 3,200-foot (980 m) buffer between new fossil fuel extraction sites and densely populated areas.

In 2022, gas prices in California exceeded $6 per gallon. Newsom attributed this to corporate greed and price gouging by oil companies. He proposed a windfall profits tax and penalty for oil companies in September 2022. On March 28, 2023, Newsom signed a law that authorizes the California Energy Commission to set "a profit threshold above which companies would be assessed a financial penalty", requires petroleum companies to report additional profit data to state regulators, and creates a new oversight division of the California Energy Commission to investigate price gouging in the gasoline industry.

== Animal welfare ==
In 2019, Newsom signed a package of legislation aimed at curtailing animal cruelty and protecting animal welfare. In September 2019, he signed the Wildlife Protection Act, which prohibited commercial and recreational fur trapping. In October 2019, he signed legislation prohibiting the manufacture and sale of new fur products in California, as well as legislation banning bobcat hunting, ending the use of most animals in circuses, and strengthening Proposition 6's prohibition on horse meat and horse slaughter. In September 2022, Newsom signed legislation that banned animal testing of pesticides and other chemical substances on dogs and cats. California's fur sales ban became effective in 2023, making California the first state to ban new fur sales.

In September 2024, Newsom signed legislation supported by animal rights and environmental activists prohibiting the commercial farming of octopuses in California. The law states that octopuses are "highly intelligent, curious, problem-solving animals" that are capable of feeling pain. California was the second state to ban octopus farming after Washington enacted a ban in March 2024. In July 2025, the Department of Justice named the state of California, Newsom, and other California public officials in a lawsuit targeting the state's regulations against intensive battery cage eggs, including Proposition 2 and Proposition 12. Newsom's office responded that the Trump administration enjoys "blaming California for literally everything".

== Ethics concerns ==
=== Donations to spouse's nonprofit organization ===
The Sacramento Bee reported that Jennifer Siebel Newsom's nonprofit organization The Representation Project had received more than $800,000 in donations from corporations that had lobbied the state government in recent years, including PG&E, AT&T, Comcast, and Kaiser Permanente. Siebel Newsom received $2.3 million in salary from the nonprofit since launching it in 2011. In 2021, Governor Newsom said that he saw no conflict in his wife's nonprofit accepting donations from companies that lobby his administration.

==== Donations to campaign ====
In February 2024, Bloomberg News reported that Newsom pushed for an exemption for businesses that bake and sell bread in AB 1228, a bill that raises the state's minimum wage for fast food workers to $20 per hour. The exemption included 24 Panera Bread bakery-cafes owned by Greg Flynn, a businessman who donated $100,000 and $64,800 to Newsom's campaigns over the years. Republican lawmakers called for an investigation into the unusual exemption. When reporters asked him about the exemption, Newsom said: "That's a part of the sausage making. We went back and forth, and that was part of the negotiation. That's the nature of negotiation ... That was all part of the give and take and that was the collective wisdom of the legislature and ultimately led to my signature."

In September 2024, the Los Angeles Times reported that Newsom had signed AB 3206 into law, carving out an exception to the state's last call alcohol law for one specific venue, Intuit Dome, owned by former Microsoft CEO Steve Ballmer. Ballmer's wife, Connie Ballmer, donated $1 million to the Newsom campaign in 2021. Ethics experts criticized the bill for exclusively benefiting a major donor to Newsom. "It's certainly going to become an issue for his opponents and critics to point to the fact that he seemed to provide a special favor to a wealthy sports franchise owner and its facility and its wealthy fans. It just doesn't look good", said John Pelissero, director of government ethics at Santa Clara University. A spokesperson for Newsom said, "The governor's decisions on legislation are made solely on the merits of each bill."

== Executive authority and actions ==
Overall, Newsom has vetoed legislation at a rate comparable to that of his predecessors. From 2019 to 2021, he vetoed 12.7% of the bills the legislature passed on average. The rate declined over the course of the three legislative sessions. Newsom's vetoes have included bills to allow ranked-choice voting, require an ethnic studies class as a high school graduation requirement, regulate AI, and reduce penalties for jaywalking.

Newsom used a larger than normal number of executive orders during the 2020 legislative session.

== Gun control ==
As lieutenant governor in 2016, Newsom was the official proponent of Proposition 63. The ballot measure required a background check and California Department of Justice authorization to purchase ammunition, among other gun control regulations. In response to the 2019 mass shooting in Virginia Beach, Newsom called for nationwide background checks on people purchasing ammunition. Later that year, he responded to the Gilroy Garlic Festival shooting by stating his support for the Second Amendment and saying he would like national cooperation controlling "weapons of goddamned mass destruction". He also said, "These shootings overwhelmingly, almost exclusively, are males, boys, 'men'—I put in loose quotes. I do think that is missing in the national conversation."

On June 10, 2021, Newsom called federal Judge Roger Benitez "a stone cold ideologue" and "a wholly owned subsidiary of the gun lobby of the National Rifle Association" after Benitez struck down California's statewide ban on assault weapons. While the ban remained in place as the state appealed the ruling, Newsom proposed legislation that would empower private citizens to enforce the ban after the United States Supreme Court declined to strike down the Texas Heartbeat Act, which empowers private citizens to report unauthorized abortions.

In 2022, Newsom signed gun control bills passed by the California Legislature. On July 1, he signed Assembly Bill 1621, which restricts privately made firearms, which were found to be linked to over 100 violent crimes in Los Angeles, and Assembly Bill 2571, which prohibited the marketing of firearms such as the JR-15 to children. On July 22, Newsom signed Senate Bill 1327, a law enabling private citizens to sue anyone who imports, distributes, manufactures or sells illegal firearms in California. The law requires courts to award statutory damages of at least $10,000 and attorney's fees.

On June 8, 2023, Newsom proposed a 28th amendment to the U.S. Constitution to raise the age to buy firearms to 21, institute universal background checks for gun purchases, mandate waiting periods and ban assault weapons for civilians. Law professor Erwin Chemerinsky called this a "terrible idea", since the advocated method (which has never been used) would be a constitutional convention (which is not understood to be limited to single amendments), potentially allowing a complete rewrite of the Constitution, or addition of other amendments on separate subjects, like abortion, or the often proposed balanced budget amendment (which liberals feel would decimate welfare programs).

== Abortion ==
In December 2021, Newsom announced his intention to make California a "sanctuary" for abortion, which included possibly paying for procedures, travel, and lodging for out-of-state abortion seekers, if the procedure is banned in Republican-led states. In March 2022, he signed a bill requiring private health insurance plans in the state to fully cover abortion procedures by eliminating associated co-pays and deductibles and increasing insurance premiums. In February 2023, Newsom organized the Reproductive Freedom Alliance of state governors supportive of abortion and reproductive rights.

After Walgreens announced in March 2023 that it would refuse to dispense abortion pills in the 21 states where it is illegal, Newsom tweeted, "California won't be doing business with @walgreens – or any company that cowers to the extremists and puts women's lives at risk, we're done." He also said that Walgreens was giving in to "right-wing bullies" and that he would determine how California can cut ties with Walgreens. He indicated that he wanted to cancel Walgreens' $54 million contract with the California state prison system. Walgreens also receives $1.5 billion for filling prescriptions for the 15 million people enrolled in the state's Medi-Cal program (California's version of Medicaid). Legal experts said that federal Medicaid laws do not allow health plans to disqualify providers for reasons other than fraud or contract violations, provisions that have prevented conservative states from blocking Medicaid spending to Planned Parenthood clinics.

== Education ==
In 2022, Newsom vowed to increase state appropriations to higher education for the next five budget years. In January 2026, $716.3 million in base funding was awarded to both CSU and UC systems, an increase from the previous fiscal year.

In 2024, the governor passed a state law to require high school students to pass a financial literacy course. The requirement will take effect beginning in 2030.

In the 2026-27 state budget, Governor Newsom proposed a shift in governance to public education in California. The reform proposed is intended to reduce redundancy and remove inefficiencies in the governance of K-12 education in the state, by bringing the oversight of the public school system under the Executive branch. The State Board of Education, an appointed 11-member body, would replace the state's Department of Education.

== Health care ==
Newsom campaigned on reducing the cost of health care and increasing access. He also indicated his support for creating a universal state health-care system. The budget passed in June 2019 expanded eligibility for Medi-Cal from solely undocumented minor children to undocumented young adults from ages 19 to 25. In 2021, Newsom signed legislation expanding Medi-Cal eligibility to undocumented residents over age 50. On June 30, 2022, he signed a $307.9 billion state budget that "pledges to make all low-income adults eligible for the state's Medicaid program by 2024 regardless of their immigration status." This budget would make California the first U.S. state to guarantee healthcare to all low-income undocumented immigrants, at a cost of $2.7 billion per year.

Newsom was criticized in early 2022 for walking back from his support for universal health care and not supporting CalCare, Assembly Bill 1400, which would have instituted single-payer healthcare in California; critics suggested that opposition from business interests, which had donated large sums to Newsom and his party, had swayed his opinion.

On July 6, 2022, Newsom signed Senate Bill 184, which established the Office of Health Care Affordability, with the stated goal to "develop data-informed policies and enforceable cost targets, with the ultimate goal of containing health care costs."

In October 2023, Newsom vetoed a bill to cap co-pays for insulin at $35.

In 2025, Newsom signed a budget which restricts new enrollment of undocumented immigrants in Medi-Cal.

== Infrastructure and development ==
=== High-speed rail ===
In his February 2019 State of the State address, Newsom announced that, while work would continue on the 171-mile (275 km) Central Valley segment from Bakersfield to Merced, the rest of the system would be indefinitely postponed, citing cost overruns and delays. This and other actions created tension with the State Building and Construction Trades Council of California, a labor union representing 450,000 members.

=== Homelessness and housing shortage ===
A poll found that California voters thought the most important issue for Newsom and the state legislature to work on in 2020 was homelessness. In his first week of office, Newsom threatened to withhold state funding for infrastructure to communities that failed to take actions to alleviate California's housing shortage. In late January 2019, he announced that he would sue Huntington Beach for preventing the construction of affordable housing. A year later, the city acted to settle the lawsuit by the state. Newsom opposes NIMBY (not-in-my-back-yard) sentiment, declaring in 2022 that "NIMBYism is destroying the state". In 2021, he signed a pair of bills into law that made zoning regulations for housing less restrictive, allowing construction of duplexes and fourplexes in lots that were previously zoned exclusively for single-family homes. Newsom also signed a bill which expedites the environmental review process for new multifamily developments worth at least $15,000,000. To participate, developers must apply directly through the governor's office.

In 2022, Newsom signed 39 bills into law intended to address California's housing crisis, three of which entailed major land use reform. One bill eliminated minimum parking requirements for housing near mass transit stations throughout the state. Michael Manville, an urban planning professor at UCLA's Luskin School of Public Affairs, called it "one of the biggest land-use reforms in the country." Another bill allowed developers to build housing on some lots previously exclusively zoned for commercial use without getting local governments' permission if a certain percentage of the housing was affordable. A third bill allowed for the construction of market-rate housing on some lots previously exclusively zoned for commercial use. In a signing ceremony for the latter two bills, Newsom warned local governments, which have a history of blocking and delaying housing developments, that they would be held accountable for future housing obstructionism. Other bills Newsom signed required localities "to approve or deny various building permits within a strict timeline" and streamlined student and faculty housing projects by allowing California colleges to skip onerous review processes for new projects. Measures and actions to reduce homelessness in California have not yet solved the problem. The number of homeless hit a record number of over 181,000 in January 2023. According to some, to cope with this problem, California must build more than 2.5 million housing units.

In October 2023, Newsom vetoed several bills aimed at expanding access to housing assistance. One was a bill to repurpose unused state-owned land for affordable housing, which Newsom said infringed on state sovereignty. Another would have expanded the number of people who qualify for state housing assistance. A third would have mandated that Medi-Cal cover the cost of housing assistance.

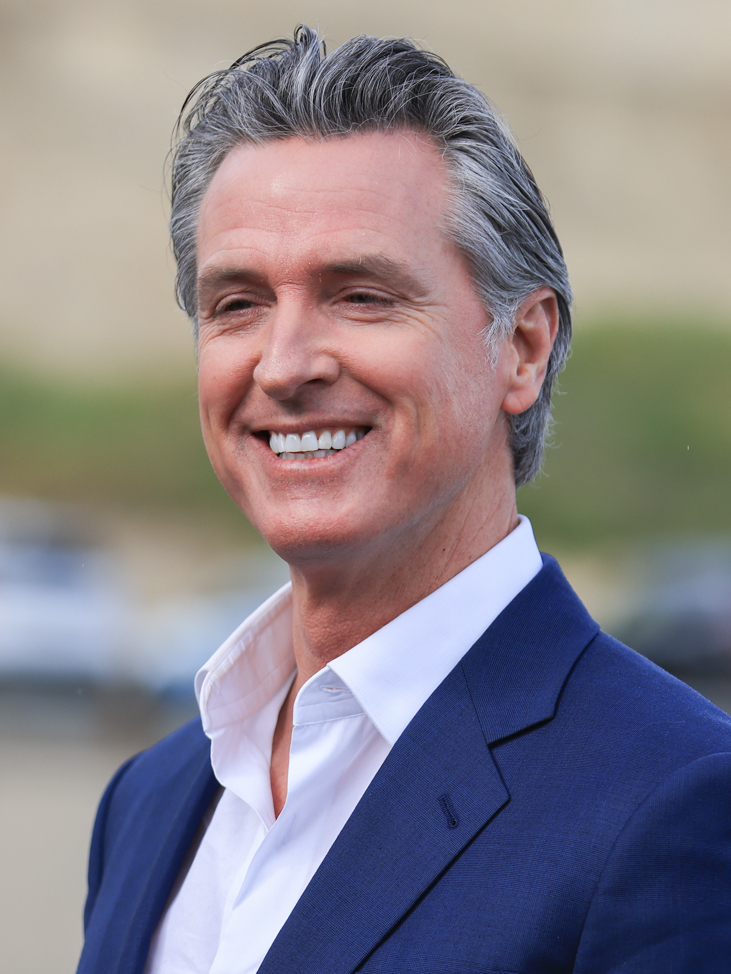
Newsom in 2024

In August 2024, Newsom warned counties that did not remove their homeless encampments that failure to do so would result in their state funding being cut off the next year. He issued this warning after personally visiting and clearing out a Los Angeles homeless encampment without notifying the city beforehand.

=== Water management ===
Newsom supports a series of tentative water-sharing agreements that would bring an end to the dispute between farmers, cities, fishers, and environmentalists over how much water should be left in the state's two most important rivers, the Sacramento and San Joaquin, which flow into the Delta.

== Privacy ==
In October 2023, Newsom signed the California Delete Act, providing a one-stop shop deletion mechanism for consumers to direct data brokers to delete their personal information.

== Acknowledgement of historical atrocities ==
=== Apology for historical genocide of Native American ===
In a speech before representatives of Native Americans in June 2019, Newsom apologized for the genocide of Native Americans approved and abetted by the California state government upon statehood in the 19th century. By one estimate, at least 4,500 Native Californians were killed between 1849 and 1870. Newsom said, "That's what it was, a genocide. No other way to describe it. And that's the way it needs to be described in the history books." In October 2024, Newsom signed AB 3074, the "California Racial Mascots Act", which prohibits K-12 schools not run by recognized Native American tribes from using "derogatory" names or mascots.

=== Acknowledgement of Armenian genocide ===
Every year as governor, Newsom formally declared April 24 as "Day of Remembrance of the Armenian Genocide" in California and publicly recognized the genocide from 2019 onwards. In 2019, Newsom met with Armenian Prime Minister Nikhol Pashinyan and signed an agreement to promote trade and investment between California and Armenia in order to deepen relations, as well as support California's large Armenian community. During the nine month Artsakh humanitarian crisis in 2023, Governor Newsom and Lieutenant Governor Eleni Kounalakis, amongst other public officials, called for an end to the blockade. In 2025, Newsom signed AB 91, a legislation authored by Armenian-American Assembly member John Harabedian, to add more detailed Middle Eastern demographic categories in California government data collections to help improve visibility for Armenians.

=== 2025 Veto of reparations legislation ===
In October 2025, Newsom vetoed legislation seeking to give the descendants of enslaved people preference in college admissions, home loan assistance and restitution for property seized in past years by the government through eminent domain.

== LGBTQ+ rights ==
In September 2022, Newsom signed Senate Bill 107 into law, making California the first sanctuary state for transgender youth. He issued an official state proclamation for Pride Month in June 2023, issued a fine of $1.5 million to a school district whose board rejected a curriculum including a biography of gay rights leader Harvey Milk, and signed a bill prohibiting schools from banning textbooks based on their inclusion of references to people from minority groups or the LGBT community. In July 2024, he signed the "SAFETY Act", which prohibits schools from outing students' gender identity to their parents without the students' consent.

Newsom vetoed several bills, passed by the Assembly by a wide margin, one of which would have instructed judges who preside over custody battles to take a parent's affirmation of a child's gender identity into account, and another of which would have mandated that insurance plans serving California residents cover the cost of gender-affirming care.

== Caste discrimination ==
In October 2023, Newsom vetoed a bill to ban discrimination based on caste, calling it "unnecessary" and adding that California "already prohibits discrimination based on sex, race, color, religion, ancestry, national origin, disability, gender identity, sexual orientation, and other characteristics, and state law specifies that these civil rights protections shall be liberally construed." Many Hindu rights organizations applauded the veto, saying the bill "would have put a target on hundreds of thousands of Californians simply because of their ethnicity or their religious identity". Advocates for the rights of Dalits and other marginalized castes sharply criticized the veto.

== Labor rights ==
In October 2023, Newsom vetoed a bill to provide unemployment insurance to striking workers, citing excess burden on the state's unemployment system. He also vetoed a bill to expand the mandatory warning given to soon to be laid off employees from 60 days to 75, extend the same protections to long-term contract workers, and prohibit employers from making laid-off employees sign nondisclosure agreements in order to receive severance.

In 2024, Newsom vetoed SB 1299 which "would have required workers’ comp judges to presume farmworkers who claim heat illness developed it at work"

== Immigration enforcement; relationship with federal enforcement officers during Trump administrations ==
In April 2025, Newsom called the illegal deportation of Kilmar Abrego Garcia to El Salvador "the distraction of the day" set up by the Trump administration. U.S. Senator Chris Van Hollen criticized Newsom's comment, saying, "I think Americans are tired of elected officials or politicians who are all finger to the wind. Anyone who can't stand up for the Constitution and the right of due process doesn't deserve to lead."

== Global relations ==
=== International travel ===
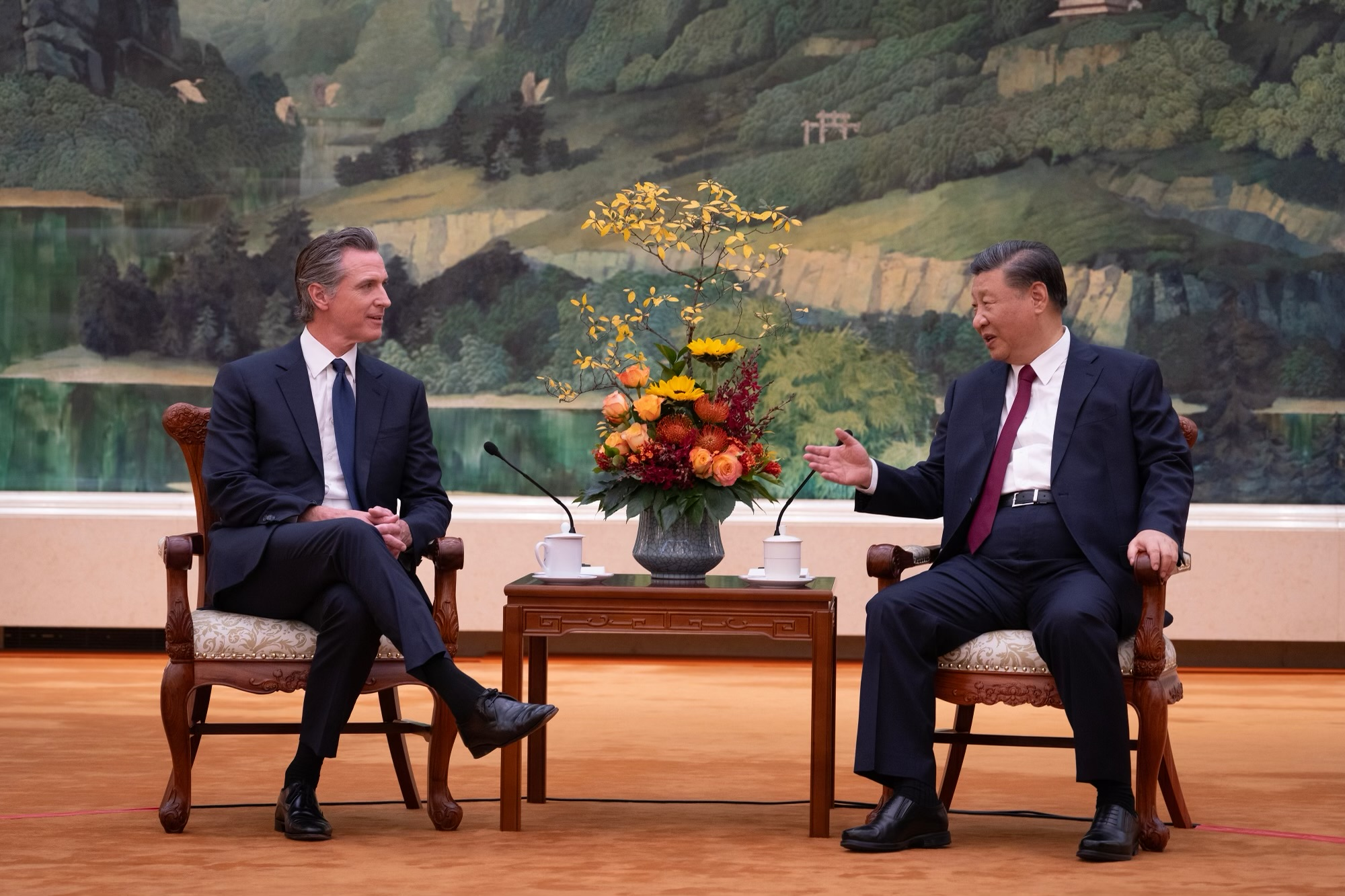
Newsom with Chinese leader Xi Jinping, October 2023

Newsom's first international trip as governor was to El Salvador. With nearly 680,000 Salvadoran immigrants living in California, he said that the "state's relationship with Central America is key to California's future". He was also concerned about the tens of thousands of Salvadorans who were fleeing the smallest country in Central America for the U.S. each year. As governor of a state impacted by the debate of illegal immigration, he went to see the factors driving it firsthand, and to build business and tourism partnerships between California and Central America. He said he wanted to "ignite a more enlightened engagement and dialogue".

On October 20, 2023, Newsom visited Israel to express solidarity with the country during the Gaza war. He met with Israeli prime minister Benjamin Netanyahu, Israeli president Isaac Herzog, other top Israeli officials, and survivors of the 2023 Hamas-led attack on Israel.

In October 2023, Newsom embarked on a week-long visit to China. It began in Hong Kong, where he attended a discussion at the University of Hong Kong about climate change. He then traveled to Beijing, where he met with Chinese leader Xi Jinping, discussing issues including climate change, trade relations, and the response to fentanyl production. Chinese officials reportedly physically blocked American media members from attending the meeting while allowing access to Chinese reporters. The visit also included stops in Guangdong, Jiangsu and Shanghai. Newsom called for better relations between the U.S. and China during the trip, saying that "divorce is not an option" for the two countries. The trip drew criticism from a coalition of 50 U.S.-based pro-democracy and human rights organizations, which issued a joint statement that attacked it for sidelining human rights concerns. Ahead of Newsom's trip to China, a spokesperson for his administration said the visit would focus on climate change, not human rights, as the latter was a federal issue.

In January 2026, Newsom traveled to Davos to speak at the World Economic Forum. The Trump administration tried to prevent him from speaking at and attending the forum. Newsom touted the 2.5 million zero-emission electric vehicles California purchased for residents to buy. He said California had resisted Trump's anti-clean energy agenda and was a counterweight to Washington DC in terms of economic progress and stopping climate change.

=== Israel ===
In August 2019, Newsom unconditionally apologized to California's Jewish community for a controversial ethnic studies draft curriculum that omitted the experience of American Jews and sometimes criticized Israel. He was described as a longtime supporter of Israel and touted the memorandum of understanding that California and Israel inked together in 2014. Newsom said that Israel, with its success in technologies like drip irrigation and wastewater recycling, had a lot to offer California. On October 20, 2023, Newsom visited Israel to express solidarity with it during the Gaza war. He met with Israeli prime minister Benjamin Netanyahu, Israeli president Isaac Herzog, other top Israeli officials, and survivors of the October 7 attacks.

In September 2025, Newsom said he had a "deep reverence" for Israel. In October 2025, he distanced himself from AIPAC, a pro-Israel lobby group, saying it was "not relevant" to his "day-to-day life", but did not say whether he would accept its support. In February 2026, Newsom said he would not accept donations from AIPAC and never had. In response, Track AIPAC said: "Gavin Newsom is a former AIPAC donor. He refuses to acknowledge the genocide in Gaza, attempted to crush pro-Palestine protests, and still supports unconditional aid to Israel."

In March 2026, Newsom said that some "are talking about Israel appropriately as sort of an apartheid state". He also condemned Trump and Netanyahu's strikes on Iran and said the U.S. should reconsider its aid to Israel's military operations overall. Newsom later backtracked on calling Israel an apartheid state, saying that he was actually talking about Israel's potential trajectory. He said: "I revere the state of Israel. I'm proud to support the state of Israel. I deeply, deeply oppose Bibi Netanyahu's leadership, his opposition to the two-state solution, and deeply oppose how he is indulging the far right as it relates to what's going on in the West Bank." That September, he said in a PBS News Hour interview that the Democratic Party is "overwhelmingly opposed to the current regime in Israel". He also said that "We want a democratic and secure Israel, and we want a secure and democratic Palestinian state as well right next door", and that "aspects of rhetoric" from some candidates are on "the spectrum of concern".

== 2025 California Proposition 50 ==
In August 2025, Newsom secured legislative approval of California Proposition 50. In November, voters will vote on a state constitutional amendment to allow congressional redistricting. The goal is to switch seats from Republican to Democratic control. It is a response to Texas's decision to redistrict its congressional map to add five new Republican seats. The measure was approved by voters in November.

== National profile and speculations about political future ==
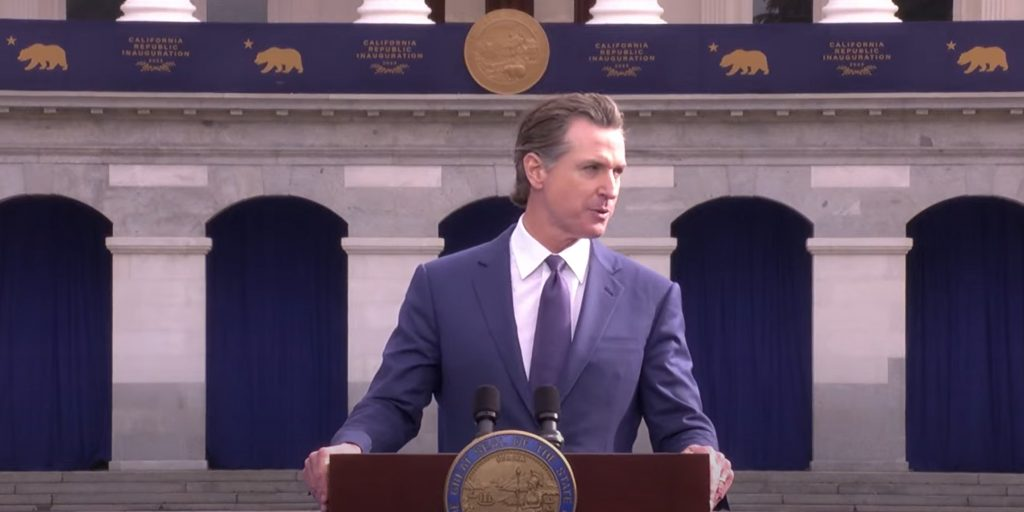
Newsom at his second gubernatorial swearing-in ceremony, at the Plaza de California, 2023

Many journalists and political analysts have mentioned Newsom as a presidential hopeful. According to a June 2023 poll by NewsNation, 22% of California voters wanted Newsom to enter the 2024 presidential election. In May 2023, Schwarzenegger said it was a "no-brainer" that Newsom would someday run for president. An April 2023 article published in The Hill by journalist Sharon Udasin also discussed the inevitability of a Newsom presidential run. In September 2022, Newsom said that he would not run for president in 2024, citing his "vulnerable" 2021 recall. After his 2022 reelection, he informed White House staff that he would not challenge President Biden in the Democratic primaries; he endorsed Biden's reelection campaign on April 25, 2023.

Newsom has become an outspoken critic of the policies of Florida governor Ron DeSantis, denouncing DeSantis's orchestration of the Martha's Vineyard migrant airlift. DeSantis responded by saying California has "huge problems" and dared Newsom to run against Biden. In November 2023, the two debated, with Fox News's Sean Hannity as moderator.

In July 2024, Newsom launched a podcast, Politickin', co-hosted by Marshawn Lynch and Doug Hendrickson. After Biden's sudden withdrawal from the presidential race that month, Newsom said he would not seek the Democratic nomination, and endorsed Vice President Kamala Harris for president.

In December 2024, Newsom criticized Biden for pardoning his son Hunter Biden. He said, "I'm disappointed and can't support the decision."

In anticipation of a potential 2028 presidential campaign, Newsom has adjusted his political approach to appeal to a broader electorate. A key shift in his strategy has been his engagement with conservative voices, including hosting MAGA figures like Charlie Kirk and Steve Bannon on his podcast, This is Gavin Newsom. While this tactic has received a fair amount of criticism from his own supporters, Newsom has also been praised by figures on the left for his hawkish response to the Trump administration's actions regarding gerrymandering, with his widely publicized Election Rigging Response Act in August 2025 seen by many commentators as a soft launch of a presidential run. In August 2025, Newsom started communicating on social media platforms in a style intended to mimic President Trump's communications.
