= Thomas Goolnik =

Right to Be Forgotten plaintiff

Thomas Goolnik is a man formerly associated with the company TLD Networks. He has achieved notoriety in a battle over the European "right to be forgotten" (RTBF), in particular whether current articles written about the RTBF are also subject to that regulation.

== TLD Network complaint and settlement ==
TLD Networks was an alternative domain name network set up by Thomas Goolnik in 2001. On February 28, 2002, the United States District Court for the Northern District of Illinois, Eastern Division, in Chicago, issued an injunction that suspended the registration of certain web sites that were registered with TLD Networks. The Federal Trade Commission (FTC) had filed the complaint, alleging that TLD Network Ltd, TLD Networks, Quantum Management Ltd, TBS Industries Ltd and Thomas Goolnik advertised and sold alternative DNS root domains, i.e. having top-level domains not approved by ICANN. The story of the original indictment was reported by The New York Times in an article on March 12, 2002. Regulators alleged that the defendants raised $1 million in registration fees during their nine months of operation.

A settlement was reached with the FTC in 2002 which, among other things, barred TLD Networks and Thomas Goolnik "from making misrepresentations about the usability of domain names or about the nature of any product or service they sell over the Internet."

In November 2003 the FTC took additional action, filing an amended complaint adding Barclays Bank PLC as a post-judgment relief defendant in the case.

== RTBF requests and responses ==
In September 2014, Goolnik was successful in getting articles removed under the right to be forgotten. The UK Government Information Commission Office also ruled in Goolnik's favour. The New York Times was notified by Google that five articles had been removed from its search results to comply with a European "Right to be Forgotten" request. The paper published an article describing the five items removed. Three were on matters of small public importance (two wedding notices and a paid death notice); one was a favorable review of a theater production. The remaining article, and the one receiving most of the attention, was the 2002 story on the injunction against TLD Network, et al.

On October 6, 2014, the web site Techdirt wrote a brief commentary on the 2014 Times article. Techdirt and the article's author, Mike Masnick, are frequent critics of the Right to be Forgotten.

On August 25, 2015, Techdirt reported that its article commenting on the 2014 New York Times article had similarly been removed from European searches due to a Right to be Forgotten request. While there is no proof, Masnick surmises that there is a "decent likelihood" that the request came from Goolnik.

On September 4, 2015, when the August 25 article was also removed from Google search in Europe. The article points out that the EU states that an RTBF request should be evaluated to see if the information is "inadequate, irrelevant or no longer relevant, or excessive in relation to the purposes for which they were processed and in the light of the time that has elapsed," while Techdirt argues that their article, "discusses newsworthy and relevant information about Thomas Goolnik today, which is that he's filing a series of right to be forgotten requests to Google."

The New York Times September 2014 story has become a commonly used example of the effects of RTBF, for example an October 2015 story by Daphne Keller. Keller's article linked to the Times article, but did not mention Goolnik by name, elliptically referring to him as "a European businessman ...."

On March 27, 2019, Techdirt published another article by Mike Masnick indicating another RTBF request had resulted in the previous articles on the site about Thomas Goolnik again being delisted. That article was delisted less than a month later, and Techdirt covered the story again on April 18, 2019. This was repeated again on March 9, 2022, resulting in the Techdirt tag page for 'thomas goolnik' being temporarily delisted from Google.
