= Tiziana Cantone =

Italian suicide victim (1983–2016)

Tiziana Giglio (born Tiziana Cantone; 15 July 1983 in Casalnuovo di Napoli – 13 September 2016 in Casalnuovo di Napoli) was an Italian woman who died by suicide after the spread on the web of some of her amateur pornographic videos.

In a bid to make her ex-boyfriend jealous, she sent videos of herself engaging in consensual sex acts with a new boyfriend to several people, including her ex-boyfriend, via the WhatsApp messaging service. Her ex-boyfriend subsequently uploaded the videos to public internet sites in early 2015. One such video went viral due to her reaction with the words "Are you filming? Good!" (Italian: Stai facendo un video? Bravo!) when being filmed performing fellatio in front of a car. The phrase appeared on T-shirts, smartphone cases and other paraphernalia.

She fought a legal case over the right to be forgotten, which led to the videos being removed from numerous EU websites. However, she was also ordered to pay 20,000 euros in legal costs. She legally changed her name and moved to a new city in attempts to avoid the publicity generated by the videos. She was initially thought to have hanged herself on a fitness tool located in the basement of her home on 13 September 2016, but new evaluation of DNA evidence has led prosecutors to order her body exhumed for re-examination in suspicion of murder.

As of 2018 her mother Maria Teresa Giglio still fights to remove the video from the Internet.

== See also ==
- Bullying
- Cyberbullying
- Revenge porn
