= Martin v. Hearst Corporation =

United States legal case

- Court: United States Court of Appeals for the Second Circuit
- Full case name: Lorraine Martin v. Hearst Corporation, Southern Connecticut Newspapers, Inc., dba Daily Greenwich, News 12 Interactive, Inc.
- Argued: August 18, 2014
- Decided: January 28, 2015
- Citation: 777 F.3d 546, Docket No. 13-3315 (2d Cir. 2015)

Court membership
- Judges sitting: John M. Walker, Jr., Dennis Jacobs, Richard C. Wesley (2d Cir.)

Keywords
- Defamation; Expungement; Right to be forgotten

Lorraine Martin v. Hearst Corporation (2d Cir. 2015) was a defamation case in the United States Court of Appeals for the Second Circuit protecting online news sources from having to remove or modify a story chronicling a person's arrest if that arrest is later erased from the record by the government using a criminal erasure statute.

The Second Circuit found that when a news source reports on an arrest, and the government subsequently erases the arrest using a criminal erasure statute, the news stories do not become defamatory, because the historical fact of the arrest remains true. The ruling protected Hearst Corporation's news outlets from having to modify or remove their online articles after plaintiff Lorraine Martin's arrest for drug possession was erased for legal purposes using Connecticut's criminal erasure statute (an expungement law). The case is seen by some as evidence that United States law cannot accommodate a right to be forgotten like the one established in the European Union in May 2014.

== Background ==
In August 2010, Lorraine Martin and her two sons were arrested in their home and charged with various drug possession offenses. Connecticut news outlets, including some owned by Hearst Corporation, posted accurate news articles online about the arrest.

In January 2012, the state dropped its case against Martin and erased her arrest from official records using Connecticut's criminal records erasure statute. Martin then asked Hearst and the other defendants to remove the articles from their websites. They refused, and she sued, claiming that the articles had become false and defamatory because the erasure statute declares someone in her position to be "deemed to have never been arrested." The United States District Court for the District of Connecticut held for Hearst Corporation, and Martin appealed to the Court of Appeals of the Second Circuit.."

== Court case ==
The Second Circuit held that the news accounts of the arrest did not become false and defamatory after the arrest was erased, so the articles could remain online and defendants did not owe damages. According to the court, Martin "misunderst[ood] the effect of the Erasure Statute", which were intended to affect legal status but "cannot undo historical facts"; for example, the statute "bars the government from relying on [the erased record] in a later trial" and "entitles a defendant to swear under oath that he has never been arrested." But "the reports of [Martin's] arrest were true at the time they were published," and "[n]either the Erasure Statute nor any amount of wishing can undo that historical truth." Judge Wesley, who authored the opinion, cited the Rubáiyát of Omar Khayyám: "the Moving Finger has written and moved on."

The court also rejected Martin's defamation-by-implication claim. Martin claimed that even if the statements of her arrest were technically not false, the articles were defamatory by implication because "they only tell part of the story" and leave out the later erasure of the arrest, effectively asking that news outlets be required to update stories with information about the erasures. The court acknowledged the validity of the defamation-by-implication tort in general, noting that "even a technically true statement can be so constructed as to carry a false and defamatory meaning by implication or innuendo." However, this was not the case here, according to the court. Wesley stated that "[r]eporting on Martin's arrest without an update may not be as complete a story as Martin would like, but it implies nothing false about her."

The court also rejected claims for negligent infliction of emotional distress ("because there is nothing negligent about publishing a true and newsworthy article"), invasion of privacy by appropriation ("because a newspaper does not improperly appropriate an individual's name or likeness merely by publishing an article that brings the individual's activities before the public") and false light ("because the articles do not contain falsehoods"). Despite the holding, the court also acknowledged that the "consequences of a criminal arrest are wide-ranging and long-lasting, even where an individual is subsequently found not guilty or the charges against him are dismissed."

== Commentary ==
Legal scholars noted the ruling's significance in relation to the right to be forgotten and the First Amendment.

=== Right to be forgotten ===
Internet law scholar Eric Goldman noted that Martin's suit was an attempt to work around the fact that there is not a right to be forgotten in the United States. He suggested that while the same result may occur under European law as applied to these news outlets, the U.S. and Europe could diverge when it came to search engines. Specifically, the Second Circuit's ruling would also protect "by extension any search engines indexing such coverage," while European law would treat search engines differently and "force them to remove content that other publishers can publish."

=== First Amendment ===
Law professor Eugene Volokh supported the District Court holding (which the Second Circuit upheld here), agreeing that if the statute had been interpreted to enable defamation liability, the law would violate the First Amendment. Similarly, Goldman noted that while the Second Circuit opinion did not mention the First Amendment, "if Connecticut or anyone else tried to extend [an] erasure law to cover third party publishers, the law would unquestionably violate the First Amendment."

== See also ==
- Defamation
- Expungement
- Right to be forgotten
