= Expungement =

Process by which a record of criminal conviction is destroyed or sealed

In some common law jurisdictions, an expungement or expunction is a legal process, usually defined by statute, through which a person may petition to have records relating to a prior criminal matter, such as an arrest or conviction, destroyed or sealed so that they are not accessible to the general public. The precise legal effect of expungement varies by jurisdiction. Black’s Law Dictionary defines "expungement of record" as the "process by which a record of criminal conviction is destroyed or sealed from the state or federal repository."

The function of an expungement is significantly different from that of a pardon. When an expungement is granted, in many jurisdictions, for most purposes the person whose record is expunged may treat the event as if it never occurred. A pardon (also called "executive clemency") does not "erase" the event; rather, it constitutes forgiveness. In the United States, an expungement can be granted only by a judge, while a pardon can be granted only by the President of the United States for federal offenses, and the state governor, certain other state executive officers, or the State Board of Pardons and Paroles (varies from state to state) for state offenses.

Each jurisdiction whose law allows expungement has its own definitions of expungement proceedings. Generally, expungement is the process to "remove from general review" the records pertaining to a case. In many jurisdictions, however, the records may not completely "disappear" and may still be available to law enforcement, to sentencing judges on subsequent offenses, and to corrections facilities to which the individual may be sentenced on subsequent convictions.

== Benefits ==
In some jurisdictions, all records on file within any court, detention or correctional facility, law enforcement or criminal justice agency concerning a person's detection, apprehension, arrest, detention, trial or disposition of an offense within the criminal justice system can be expunged. Each state sets its own guidelines for what records can be expunged, or for whether expungements are available at all.

The petitioner requesting an expungement of all or part of their record will have to complete forms and instructions to submit to the appropriate authority. The petitioner may choose to hire an attorney to guide them through the process, or he/she can decide to represent themselves. This is called appearing pro se.

== Limits ==
A criminal record can only be expunged by the jurisdiction in which it was created. The federal government cannot order the expungement of state criminal records. States cannot order the expungement of records from other states or jurisdictions.

When applying for a state professional license or job that is considered a public office or high security (such as security guard, law enforcement, or related to national security), one may be required to disclose that they have an expunged conviction. For example, failure to disclose an expunged criminal charge may result in denial of a license or denial of a security clearance by the Department of Justice. Some criminal convictions may result in automatic denials of licensure, whether expunged or not.

== Worldwide ==
=== Australia ===
Criminal records in each state of Australia are covered by state law. In New South Wales, the relevant legislation is the Criminal Records Act 1991. Under the Act, an offender's criminal record may become spent if they do not re-offend for a period of 10 years. Offenses resulting in a prison term of more than six months will not become spent. Additionally, for certain employment occupations (e.g. education or child services), a "full disclosure" check is required, and spent convictions are still visible.

=== Canada ===
In June 2018, the Parliament of Canada enacted the Expungement of Historically Unjust Convictions Act, in order to further promote LGBT rights and cancel out certain criminal laws that were once effective. Under the Act, the Parole Board of Canada must order expungement of a conviction in respect of an offence that relates to acts of gross indecency, anal intercourse or buggery, as defined prior to 1969 and later on under the now repealed section 159 of the Criminal Code, if the activity for which the person was convicted was between persons of the same sex, the persons other than the person who was convicted had given their consent to participate in the activity, and the persons who participated in the activity were 16 years of age or older at the time the activity occurred.

When notified of the expungement order, the RCMP and any federal department or agency must destroy or remove any judicial record of the conviction to which the expungement order relates that is in its repositories or systems. Provincial and municipal police forces and courts must also be notified of the expungement order. The person convicted of the offence is then deemed never to have been convicted of that offence.

=== Europe ===
The European Court of Human Rights has ruled that a person has a right to have their convictions erased from all records after the passing of certain time. As of September 2020, there is currently a case pending with the Court which aims at the ruling that permanent keeping of the records is excessive.

=== New Zealand ===
Expungement in New Zealand is regulated by the Criminal Records (Clean Slate) Act 2004.

=== South Africa ===
In 2008 there was an amendment to sections 2 and 3 of the South African Criminal Procedure Act (51 of 1977) known as the Criminal Procedure Amendment Act (65 of 2008). This new law came into effect on 6 May 2009. In summary, the new law says that those convicted of a minor offense, determined by the type of sentence imposed, 10 or more years ago, qualify for the expungement of their criminal record. The sentence must have been a suspended jail term, correctional supervision or a fine.

=== United Kingdom ===
In the United Kingdom the term "stepping-down of convictions" is used. The relevant legislation is the Rehabilitation of Offenders Act 1974. Offences punished by less than five years' imprisonment become spent after a period of time depending on the severity of the sentence; they remain on the offender's criminal record, but are not revealed in basic criminal record checks by the Disclosure and Barring Service (DRB) or Disclosure Scotland, are inadmissible as evidence in certain circumstances, and in most cases may not be used as a reason to refuse or terminate insurance or employment.

In the data retention model of the Police National Computer, arrests which do not lead to a finding of guilt "step down" as soon as the relevant decision is made (typically a "not guilty" verdict or a dismissal of charges) and become visible to law enforcement only. Records of cautions and minor convictions do not step down and remain on the PNC and on enhanced DRB checks until the offender's 100th birthday.

Since the passing of the Protection of Freedoms Act 2012, people convicted for homosexual acts between consenting adults under section 12 of the Sexual Offences Act 1956 can apply to have the conviction totally removed from their criminal record. Clause 96 confirms the effect of a successful application would ensure the person is considered as having not committed, nor been charged, prosecuted or convicted of a homosexual act.

=== United States ===
In the United States, most states allow for expungement of criminal records, though laws vary significantly by state. The availability of expungement and the type of charge or conviction that may be expunged will depend upon the laws of the state in which the case was prosecuted.

In some states, once sealed or expunged, all records of an arrest and/or subsequent court case are removed from the public record, and the individual may legally deny or fail to acknowledge ever having been arrested for or charged with any crime which has been expunged. Even after expungement, other states may maintain a public or confidential record of the charge and its disposition.

==== Eligibility for expungement ====
===== State expungement =====
Eligibility for an expungement of an arrest, investigation, detention, or conviction record will be based on the law of the jurisdiction in which the record was made. Ordinarily, only the subject of the record may ask that the record be expunged. Often, the subject must meet a number of conditions before the request will be considered. Some jurisdictions allow expungement for the deceased.

Requirements may include one or more of the following:

- Fulfilling a waiting period between the incident and expungement;
- Having no intervening incidents;
- Having no more than a specified number of prior incidents;
- That the conviction be of a nature not considered to be too serious;
- That all terms of the sentence be completely fulfilled;
- That no proceedings be pending;
- That the incident was disposed without a conviction; and
- That the petitioner complete probation without any incidents.

Types of convictions that are often not eligible for expungement include:

- Murder
- Felonies and first degree misdemeanors in which the victim is under 18 years of age
- Rape
- Sexual battery
- Corruption of a minor
- Sexual imposition
- Obscenity or pornography involving a minor
- Serious weapons charges

Most jurisdictions have laws that allow the expungement of juvenile records once the juvenile reaches a certain age, and some states have automatic expungement procedures for juvenile records. In some cases, the records are destroyed; sometimes they simply are "sealed." The purpose of these laws is to allow a minor who was accused of criminal acts, or in the language of many juvenile courts, "delinquent acts," to erase his record, typically at the age of 17 or 18. The idea is to allow the juvenile offender to enter adulthood with a "clean slate," shielding him or her from the negative effects of having a criminal record.

States have taken significantly different approaches when it comes to expungement for controlled substance violations such as marijuana and hashish. Typically, only convictions of possession or possession with the intent to distribute are eligible for expungement. Factors such as the weight/amount of the particular substance, age of the offender, and the number of offenses may impact eligibility for expungement as well. For example, in New Jersey, the threshold is 25 grams for marijuana and 5 grams for hashish if the offense occurred when the offender was 21 years of age or younger.

Procedures for obtaining an expungement are different in each state, but tend to follow a similar process:

- The petitioner verifies his or her eligibility for expungement under state law;
- The petitioner prepares a petition for expungement, often using a standard petition form;
- The petitioner files the petition with the court where the conviction occurred, and serves copies of the petition on other interested parties such as the prosecutor's office;
- The court holds a hearing on the petition to verify that the petitioner is eligible for expungement and that the grant of expungement is proper;
- The court issues an order either granting or denying the petition.

====== California ======
California's expungement law permits someone convicted of a crime to file a Petition for Dismissal with the court to re-open the case, set aside the plea, and dismiss the case. In order for one to qualify for expungement, the petitioner must have completed probation, paid all fines and restitution, and not currently be charged with a crime. If the requirements are met for eligibility, a court may grant the petition if it finds that it would be in the interest of justice to do so.

A successful expungement will not erase the criminal record, but rather the finding of guilt will be changed to a dismissal. The petitioner then can honestly and legally answer to a question about their criminal history, with some exceptions, that they have not been convicted of that crime. What is actually stated on the record of the case is that the case was dismissed after conviction. If the petitioner is later convicted of the same crime again, then the expungement may be reversed.

Persons who serve sentences in the state prison system for felony convictions must apply to the Superior Court for a Certificate of Rehabilitation (CR). The CR does not remove or expunge anything negative from the individual's record; however, it places something positive on it.

Among other requirements, the applicant must live in California and have done so for at least 5 consecutive years prior to applying, and been law-abiding for 7 years starting from the sooner of their release from prison or court supervision. After they meet all requirements and receive a CR, certain rights of theirs are restored and a request for a pardon is automatically sent to the governor.

California Penal Code 1203.4 allows most types of convictions may be expunged. To qualify, the person must have completed probation, satisfied all financial obligations, not currently be facing charges or court supervision, and not have been sentenced to prison or parole.

California law allows an individual to reduce a "wobbler" offense from felony to misdemeanor, which will effectively restore firearm rights, provided that the individual has not been convicted of another felony or has not lost his or her firearm rights for another reason.

Juvenile criminal court records remain unless the individual petitions to have them sealed. This may be done when they reach their 18th birthday, even though some states provide for automatic expungement of certain juvenile records regardless of age.

===== Federal expungement =====
There is no post-conviction relief available in the federal system, other than a presidential pardon. Congressman Charles B. Rangel proposed the Second Chance Act in 2007, 2009, and 2011, which was intended to "[amend] the federal criminal code to allow an individual to file a petition for expungement of a record of conviction for a nonviolent criminal offense".

===== Washington, D.C. =====
In Washington, D.C., the Second Chance Act (2022) which goes into effect in 2027 will automatically seal and expunge felony records for some felons.

==== Firearm rights restoration ====
One of the major benefits for the individual of expunging a criminal record is that there is a chance the individual may regain their right to possess a firearm. Federal laws deprive individuals with felony and domestic violence offenses of their firearm rights. Some states also have statutes depriving individuals of certain gun rights, usually for a definitive period of time.

Expungement may restore gun rights in some states but will not be sufficient to restore firearms rights in others. Seeking restoration of firearm rights may require that the petitioner specifically request restoration of those rights, or may require that the petitioner obtain a pardon that fully restores his or her civil rights.

== See also ==
- Martin v. Hearst Corporation
- Pardon
- Record sealing
- Rehabilitation Policy
