= Duedil =

DueDil (t/a FullCircl)
- Available in: English
- Key people: Justin Fitzpatrick (CEO)
- Revenue: £4.1 million (2017)
- Employees: 110 (2019)
- Website: www.fullcircl.com/duedil
- Registration: Required
- Launched: April 2011; 15 years ago

DueDil is a company intelligence platform covering the SME economy. In August 2021 DueDil merged with Artesian Solutions and subsequently rebranded as FullCircl.

== Services and products ==
DueDil pulls in data from a wide range of sources and digitises it, allowing users to search for information, find new customers and mitigate risk.

Company search results provide information including up to 20 years of financial data, mortgages, investments, red flags, litigations, and group ownership structures.

Director search results show individual director profiles, including full name, birthdate, nationality, known aliases, timelines of current and previous directorships, and social media profiles. The platform has commonly been used for compliance checks (e.g. KYC, KYB), credit risk assessments, and business development purposes.

DueDil features include an alert function that allows users to track and receive updates on companies of interest, detailed company and director search filters, financial metrics, news, group graphs, charts, and integration with social networks. In March 2017, DueDil released the fourth version of its API allowing businesses to integrate DueDil data with their internal systems. Through a partnership with Callcredit Information Group, DueDil provides a service that allows users to conduct verification checks on businesses and connected individuals at the same time.

== History ==
DueDil was co-founded by American entrepreneur, Damian Kimmelman in 2011 and Justin Fitzpatrick. The company launched at TechCrunch's ‘GeeknRolla’ conference on 21 March 2011, winning 'Best Startup'. In February 2018, co-founder Justin Fitzpatrick stepped into the role of CEO.

The company has been nominated for numerous awards and is recognised as one of the UK's most promising financial technology companies. DueDil was named by Wired magazine in 2013 as one of Europe's hottest startups, and in 2016 Bloomberg named the company as one of its Business Innovators. The UK government's Cabinet Office transparency team has also cited DueDil as a business providing innovative services using open data.

CEO Damian Kimmelman was named as 'International Entrepreneur of Year' at the inaugural Tech City News Hall of Fame awards in June 2014, and in October 2014 as one of the 1,000 most influential Londoners by the Evening Standard.

Significant campaigns launched by DueDil include research by with the Centre for Entrepreneurs into levels of company formation by immigrants in the UK, showing that migrant entrepreneurs have created one in seven UK companies. DueDil also provided the data behind the first-ever Tech Nation report, which charted the growth of the UK tech sector. Since 2015, the London Stock Exchange Group has used DueDil data to create its "1000 Companies to Inspire" report.

Since 2011, DueDil has raised nearly $30m from investors in the US and UK, including Oak Investment Partners, Passion Capital and Notion Capital. DueDil received funding from the European Union's Horizon 2020 research and innovation programme under grant agreement No 733164.

DueDil data has been regularly cited in the business press. Research by DueDil found that one in five directors of UK tech companies are foreign citizens, with a significant increase in the number of EU nationals in founding positions since 2010. In 2017, DueDil revealed high street banks charge small firms 20% interest. In 2018, DueDil research revealed that only 13% of women held top directorships in Britain, demonstrating a significant gender pay gap in senior leadership.

In 2021, DueDil was rebranded as FullCircl.
