= California Privacy Protection Agency =

California state government agency

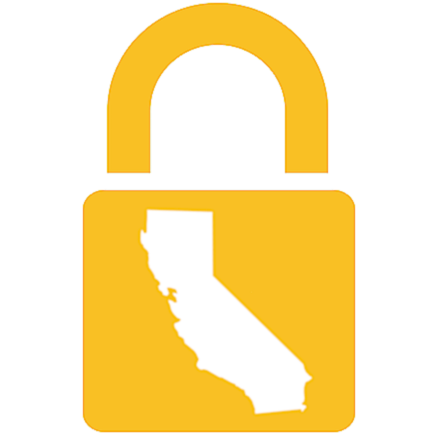
- CPPA Logo

Agency overview
- Formed: 16 December 2020; 5 years ago
- Jurisdiction: California
- Annual budget: US$10 million
- Agency executives: Tom Kemp, Executive Director; Jennifer M. Urban, Inaugural Board Chair
- Website: cppa.ca.gov

The California Privacy Protection Agency (CPPA), known publicly as CalPrivacy, is a California state government agency created by the California Privacy Rights Act (CPRA).

== Overview ==
As the first dedicated privacy regulator in the United States, the agency implements and enforces the CPRA and the California Consumer Privacy Act.

With the enactment of the California Delete Act, the agency also maintains the California data broker registry and on January 1, 2026 launched the Delete Request and Opt-out Platform (DROP) one-stop shop data deletion mechanism for California consumers.

== History ==
Ashkan Soltani, a former technologist at the Federal Trade Commission (FTC), became the executive director of the CPPA in 2021.

He left the position in 2025 and was succeeded by Tom Kemp, a privacy advocate and former CEO of Centrify.

== See also ==
- Privacy and the US government
