= Kammergericht Berlin - 31 May 2017 - 21 U 9/16: Heirs not granted access to deceased's social media account =

KG Berlin - 31 May 2017 - 21 U 9/16
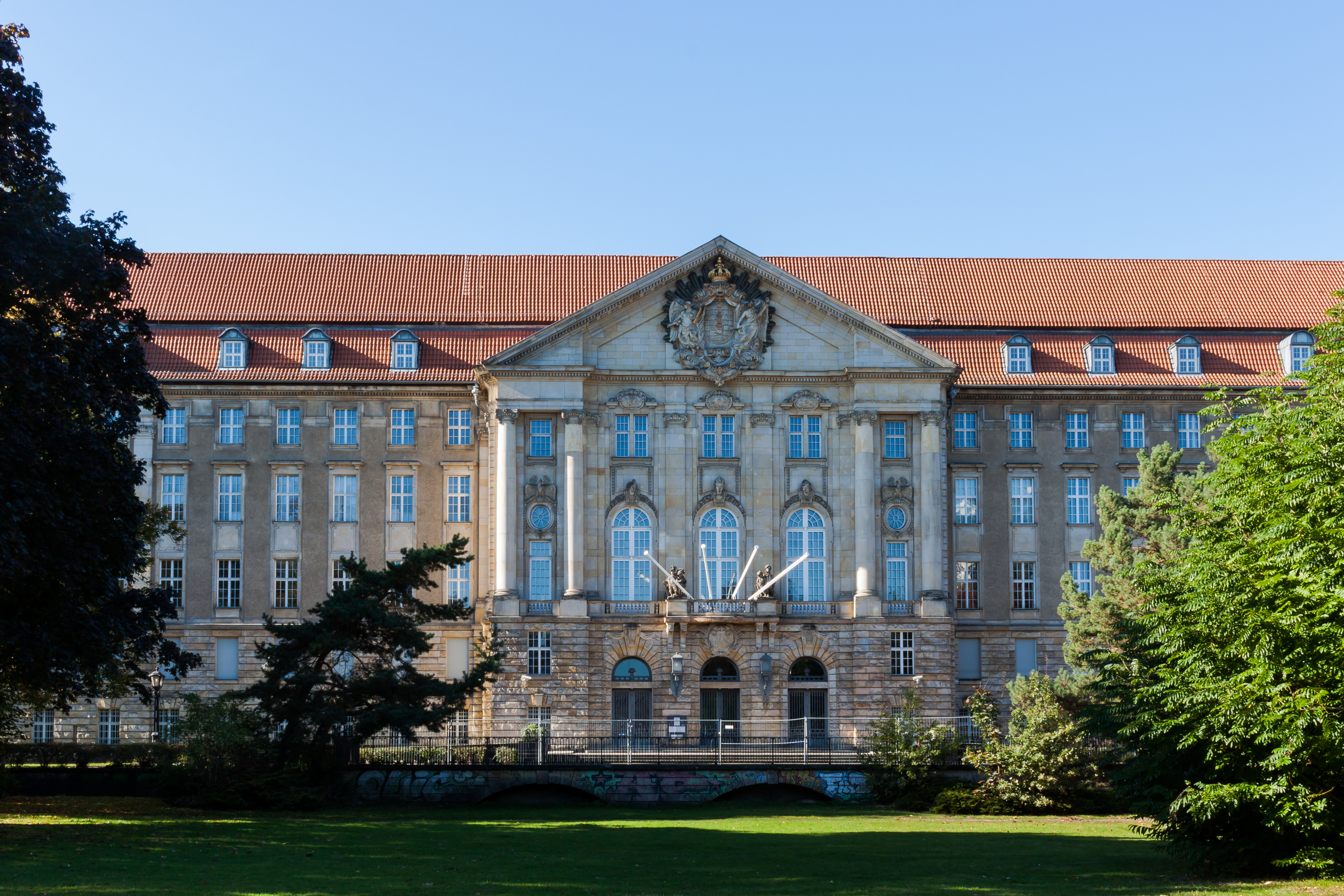
- Court: Kammergericht Berlin
- Decided: 31 May 2017

Case history
- Appealed from: LG Berlin - 17 December 2015 - 20 O 172/15
- Appealed to: BGH - III ZR 183/17

Holding
- First instance reversed, claim dismissed

This case before the Kammergericht (higher regional court, abbreviated KG) in Berlin (reference number 21 U 9/16) is a second-instance court decision that was decided on 31 May 2017 in favour of the defendant, Facebook, who were denying parents access to the social media account of their deceased daughter. This ruling, together with its first instance, was the first German court case to consider matters of digital legacy. It left questions of inheritance law open, relying instead on telecommunications secrecy.

== Facts ==
The claimant was the mother of a fifteen-year-old girl who died in December 2012 under as yet unexplained circumstances by colliding with an underground train. She and the father are the girl's heirs.

The defendant is the social network Facebook, where the daughter had an account since January 2011 with the consent of her parents.

The claimant wished to find information about her daughter's death through the deceased's Facebook account, allegedly having previously received the password from the girl. This proved fruitless, as Facebook memorialised the account, making it impossible to log on.

The claimant thus sought to get access to the account and the communications it contained.

== First Instance ==
Before this, the case was considered before the Landgericht (regional court) in Berlin (reference number 20 O 172/15).

The Landgericht ruled in favour of the claimant and ordered Facebook to grant access to the daughter's account. This decision was subsequently overturned by the Kammergericht.

== Findings ==
The court dismissed the claim.

=== Inheritance Law ===
In Germany, heirs universally succeed all assets of the deceased, section 1922 Civil Code (Bürgerliches Gesetzbuch).

The court followed academic commentators in holding that generally the contract a social media account is based on can be inherited by way of succession, so an heir could take the place of the deceased as the account's “owner”; a claim under section 1922 Civil Code is generally possible.

The Kammergericht upheld the Landgericht’s assessment that Facebook's terms and conditions, being too vague, did not make the account noninheritable. The help pages concerned with memorialised accounts together with the terms and conditions do show that Facebook only wishes to actively offer its services to the person who opened the account; this does not however preclude a passive right to read and access stored data. The court also upheld that the impossibility of inheritance was not intrinsic to the contract. Furthermore, Facebook does not have special confidentiality obligations comparable to doctors or lawyers.

However, there was found to be no clarity on whether valueless, very personal interests (such as the communications in a social media account) are included in universal succession. Rather, items in the succession need to be some form of property of the deceased; differentiating between messages of very personal interest and such with some relation to property is difficult in practice. After accounting for both sides of the argument, citing various sources of literature, the Kammergericht left the question open.

=== Telecommunications Secrecy Law ===
The court goes on to state that the questions of inheritance do not need to be answered definitively as the defendant mustn’t share its data with the claimant due to telecommunications secrecy, which is entrenched in section 88(3) Telecommunications Act (Telekommunikationsgesetz); thus, the claim cannot be granted. Section 88 Telecommunications Act is identical in content to the telecommunications secrecy in the Basic Law (Grundgesetz), the German constitution, but applies to private entities instead of the state.

==== Application ====
Facebook as the provider of the social media network is subject to § 88 Telecommunications Act, at least when a user shares or messages with others.

The defendant stated that it is exempt from application as the internet provider is responsible for signal transmission. The court did not accept this, citing a case decided by an administrative court (Verwaltungsgericht) in Cologne in 2015 (Verwaltungsgericht Köln – 11.11.2015 – 21 K 450/15), which applied telecommunications law to the email service Gmail. The Kammergericht agreed with the court's reasoning that signal transmission can be ascribed to a communication provider, based on a court decision of the European Court of Justice (C-475/12 – 30/04/2014).

Facebook was also not held exempt due to its nature as a Telemedia service provider, falling under the Telemedia Act (Telemediengesetz). Rather, the Kammergericht stated that even if it had followed the defendant's view on the application of the Telecommunications Act above, section 88 Telecommunications Act also applied to Telemedia service providers. The court followed with a short explanation of why the German Telemedia Act is applicable to the defendant.

The court then continued to detail why the content and circumstances of messages stored by the defendant fall under section 88 Telecommunications Act and are “telecommunication”. Here it referenced a decision by the Federal Constitutional Court (Bundesverfassungsgericht) (2 BvR 902/06 – 16/06/2009 – BverfGE 124, 43) on email. According to the decision, the protection of the constitutional telecommunications secrecy is not limited to dynamic communication processes; rather, it is decisive whether the person partaking in a communication has technical control over the communication and can prevent its transfer. It was held that in the case of static emails still stored on the servers of the email provider, there was no such control. The Kammergericht drew the parallel to messages stored on the Facebook servers, mentioning again that the scopes of the constitutional telecommunications secrecy and the one encased in the Telecommunications Act are identical.

==== Exceptions ====
The first two sentences of section 88(3) Telecommunications Act permit the passing on of communication if it is necessary for the commercial provision of telecommunications or their security. The Kammergericht rejected the first-instance court's assessment that giving access to heirs is “necessary” to the business model as Facebook explicitly only allows the personal use of accounts, not the use by others.

The third sentence of section 88(3) Telecommunications Act only allows for the re-transmission to others if there is a statutory exception that explicitly mentions telecommunication (imperative of citation). Section 1922 Civil Code, on which the inheritance claim is based on, does not fulfil this requirement; and neither do provisions concerned with data protection in the Telecommunications Act.

The Kammergericht subsequently does not follow the first-instance court or various academics, which have stated that there is no need for such citation in this situation, not finding the arguments convincing enough to disregard the explicit wording of section 88 Telecommunications Act.

The court also rejected the claimant's reasoning that the requirement of citation is in violation of European Union law. The claimant relies on a judgement by the European Court of Justice on the Data Protection Directive, (C-582/14 – 19/10/2016), however the Kammergericht stressed that section 88 Telecommunications Act is not based on this directive, but on the Basic Law; as such, it needs not be interpreted in line with EU law.

==== Consent ====
Failing the exceptions of section 88(3) Telecommunications Act, the Kammergericht denies access owing to consent as at least the consent of the deceased's communication partners is missing. The court leaves open whether or not the deceased gave consent, as both parties of a communication need to assent. There is also no implied or presumed consent on the partners’ side, as they did not need to expect others to have access to their conversations (Facebook's memorialisation policy raising opposite expectations) and did not obviously wish to forgo telecommunications secrecy. This remains unchanged by the deceased's age.

=== Other bases for claims ===
The Kammergericht shortly dismissed other claims by the defendant based on damages, parental care and the defendant's personality rights.

== Appeal to the Federal Supreme Court ==
The decision of the Kammergericht is not yet legally binding.

The claimant has appealed the case to the German Federal Supreme Court, where the case has the reference III ZR 183/17, with oral proceedings scheduled for the 21 June 2018.
