= Delaware SB21 =

Delaware SB21 (Note: Introduced as "An Act to amend Title 8 of the Delaware Code Relating to the General Corporation Law.) is a bill in the United States state of Delaware that changes the corporate law in Delaware which grants a safe harbor from liability for transactions in which involved parties have grievances. According to proponents of the bill, the bill is supposed to make clear Delaware corporate law.

The bill was created after a series of legal cases involving corporate law in Delaware, including a unanimous decision by the Delaware Supreme Court that to block a CEO compensation deal to Elon Musk. Telsa lawyers began litigating for a new bill, and Musk led a harassment campaign against the court. The bill passed the Delaware Senate and advanced to the Delaware House of Representatives. Polling showed just 21-26% support for the bill and 50-55% of Delawares opposed the bill, with 30-34% unsure. 16% support passing SB21 as is, compared to 61% who oppose. 63% of those polled stated they would be less likely to support to support candidates who voted in favor of the bill. In response lawmakers passed various revisions and new amendments to the bill requiring that parties act in good faith and without gross negligence and to inform all "members of the board of directors or committee are informed as to the material facts of the transaction." Other revisions gave more power to stockholders compared to the original draft.
