= FTC v. Balls of Kryptonite =

2009 enforcement action over deceptive business practices

- Court: United States District Court for the Central District of California
- Full case name: FEDERAL TRADE COMMISSION, Plaintiff, v Jaivin Karnani, BALLS OF KRYPTONITE, LLC, a California Limited Liability Company, all doing business as Bite Size Deals, LLC and Best Priced Brands, LLC, and INTRIGUE INC., a Belize corporation, doing business as Crazy Cameras, Defendants.
- Decided: May 20, 2011
- Citation: CV 09-05276 DDP (Ex).

Court membership
- Judge sitting: Dean D. Pregerson

FTC v. Balls of Kryptonite is an enforcement action brought in 2009 by the U.S. Federal Trade Commission (FTC) in United States District Court for the Central District of California. The defendant was Jaivin Karnani, a Southern California man, his company Balls of Kryptonite LLC, and several other corporate names they did business as. In 2011 the FTC secured a court order barring Karnani and Balls of Kryptonite from engaging in many of the deceptive business practices that had brought him to the agency's attention.

For several years before the FTC brought its case, Karnani had been selling consumer electronic devices such as cameras, video game systems and computer software to customers in the United Kingdom. Despite being physically located in California, he registered his websites in British domains, quoted prices in pounds sterling and took other steps to suggest that the business was physically located in the U.K. Customers who bought the merchandise at the prices quoted, usually significantly lower than other, established British retailers, found that delivery took in some cases far longer than the promised 48 hours even though their credit cards were charged immediately and they were told they could not cancel their orders. In many cases, the goods they received were inoperable since they had never been intended for sale in the British or European markets, and were thus not protected by warranty.

Complaints to the U.K.'s Office of Fair Trading (OFT) led to the FTC's enforcement action. In response to its initial complaint Judge Dean D. Pregerson issued a temporary restraining order barring Karnani and his companies from misrepresenting their location on their websites along with the other practices customers had complained to OFT about. It was the first time the FTC had brought an action against an American company that did business exclusively abroad, its first action enforcing the U.S./EU Safe Harbor Privacy Program and one of the first uses of its expanded ability to coordinate its efforts with foreign counterparts under the SAFE WEB Act Congress had passed several years earlier.

The FTC's decision to pursue the case came in for some criticism. Some commentators, who thought the case title was humorous enough to make extended references to the Superman comics in their commentary, questioned whether the commission's action against a retailer who did not deceive any American consumers was a wise use of its limited resources, and whether it might have been better to prosecute him in Britain. Another, in the course of criticizing the failings of the European Union's Data Protection Directive when it came to dealing with cloud computing, did not criticize the enforcement action as such but showed that it pointed out how much more work needed to be done in ensuring compliance with the Safe Harbor Program.

== Background ==
In 2006, the FTC later alleged, Karnani, a resident of Pasadena, California, created two companies, Best Price Brands LLC and Bite Size Deals LLC. He then registered websites in their names with the .co.uk top-level domain, offering consumer electronics such as cameras, video game systems, and computer software. Prices were given in pounds sterling—often considerably below those charged by other online retailers.

The domain name and the pound pricing led many visitors to believe that the company was based in the United Kingdom. British consumers began ordering items from the site in late 2006. Many found the goods and services deficient, and even fraudulent.

For example, the company charged buyers' credit cards for their purchases immediately, promising delivery within 48 hours. Many orders, however, did not ship for weeks. Customers who called or emailed about this were often ignored, with those who persisted and/or supplemented their queries with complaints to the Better Business Bureau told that there were delays, such as the item being out of stock, which they had never consented to or been informed of prior to their purchase. When they tried to cancel their orders they were informed that "company policy", which they were not made aware of prior to purchase, did not allow them to do so at that point.

Those to whom goods were delivered were often equally dissatisfied. Instructions were sometimes in Spanish or Chinese, making it difficult to use the product. Some products were shipped with plugs and internal wiring meant for the U.S. market, making them unusable in Britain (in a few cases, the company did provide a power converter, the FTC conceded). Even products usable in Britain turned out not to have been manufactured for sale there, or in the European Union (EU) generally, meaning they were not covered by manufacturers' warranties.

Those who attempted to return products met with similar resistance from the website owner, Balls of Kryptonite LLC, which Karnani formed and merged the other two companies into in mid-2007. They were variously told that the time limit for a refund has passed, or that a 50% restocking fee would be deducted from it.

Customers seeking refunds had to mail the products back at their own expense. Only then did some learn that, despite the domain name, pricing and British address given in some correspondence, the company was actually located in California. This could have made them liable for the import taxes and customs duties on the goods.

The company did state its true location on its websites, but not "clearly and conspicuously" enough to offset the perception that they were British, the FTC later said. This deceit had impacts beyond invalidating any warranties. It meant that, contrary to what British buyers may have thought, their country's regulations on mail-ordered products did not apply to their purchases. Karnani and Balls of Kryptonite also claimed on their website that they had self-certified their compliance with the U.S.-E.U. Safe Harbor Program for protection of personal data, when in fact they had not.

== Enforcement ==
The dissatisfied customers complained to Britain's Office of Fair Trading, which handles consumer protection issues. Officials there got in touch with their counterparts at the FTC in the U.S. They were able to take action due to the Undertaking Spam, Spyware, And Fraud Enforcement With Enforcers Beyond Borders Act of 2006, commonly known as the SAFE WEB Act, which Congress had passed at the commission's request to help them coordinate actions against Internet fraudsters who operate across international boundaries with similar agencies in other countries, such as OFT. Most relevant to its case against Karnani, the legislation had clarified that the FTC had authority over American companies that did business exclusively with customers abroad. Its action against Karnani and Balls of Kryptonite was the first it had undertaken against one.

In July 2009 commissioners voted 4–0 to proceed with the complaint; it was formally filed later that month in federal court for the Central District of California. A week later Judge Dean D. Pregerson issued a temporary restraining order barring Karnani, Balls of Kryptonite, any of his other companies (including one he had incorporated in Belize) and anyone employed by him from misrepresenting the company's physical location or its participation in any program sponsored by a third party through any means and delaying orders without giving the buyer a chance to consent to the delay or cancel it. The order also required that he make corporate financial records available to the FTC on request and not start any new companies without notifying their attorneys.

Two years later, the FTC and Karnani settled the case with a consent decree. The defendants agreed to make the prohibitions of the 2009 order permanent. They were further barred from processing any transaction until the goods were ready to ship and not disputing any customer chargebacks made prior to a year before the decree. A $500,000 judgement against the defendants was entered, but suspended due to their inability to pay unless business records submitted in response to the FTC's requests were found to be falsified. Karnani and the other defendants admitted no wrongdoing.

== Analysis and commentary ==
A few weeks after the consent decree, three lawyers at Arnold & Porter commented on the disposition of the case on their firm's consumer-protection law blog.

The FTC's investigation of BOK raises an interesting question as to whether foreign consumers will become the FTC's new Lois Lane, leaving US consumers to be the former childhood sweetheart but still close friend, Lana Lang ... While there is nothing in the FTC's mandate that requires it to exclusively protect US consumers, one could question whether this investigation was the most efficient use of the FTC's resources given that that the goods were sold into the UK market and only UK customers were targeted by the allegedly deceptive acts.

The references to the Superman characters were a running gag in the post, prompted by the use of "kryptonite" in the defendant company's name. "[I]t could also be argued that it would have been more appropriate to prosecute BOK under Metropolis's—or rather, the UK's consumer protection laws," they observed. "With increasingly more commerce being conducted over the Internet, it is likely that cross-border fraud similar to what occurred in this case will become more common," they concluded. "As a result, the FTC may have tough decisions as to where to direct their resources, especially given the current budget crisis."

Other legal analyses of the decision place the decision as a pivotal change in US enforcement on the EU/US safe harbor program, being the first time the FTC had brought enforcement against a company for violation safe harbor principles. Shortly after the action against Balls of Kryptotine, the FTC also settled with 6 other companies over claims they had falsely claimed membership in Safe Harbor.
