= Data Protection Commissioner =

Irish independent national authority tasked with enforcing EU privacy protections

Data Protection Commission
- Incumbent [Des Hogan, Dale Sunderland, Niamh Sweeney]
- Office of the Data Protection Commissioner
- Status: Independent Regulator
- Formation: 1989

The Data Protection Commission, is the independent national authority responsible for upholding the EU fundamental right of individuals to data protection through the enforcement and monitoring of compliance with data protection legislation. It was established on 25th May 2018, under the Data Protection Act 2018, succeeding the former Office of the Data Protection Commissioner.

== Role and operations ==
The independent role and powers of the Data Protection Commission are as set out in legislation in the Data Protection Acts 1988-2018. These Acts transpose the Council of Europe 1981 Data Protection Convention (Convention 108), the 1995 EU Data Protection Directive (Directive 95/46/EC). However, the latter was then replaced by the EU General Data Protection Regulation (GDPR), which is directly applicable upon Member States such as Ireland.

=== Investigation of complaints ===
Complaints received from individuals who feel that their personal data is not being treated in accordance with the data protection law are investigated under the GDPR and the Data Protection Act(s). It is the statutory obligation of the Commission to seek to amicably resolve complaints in the first instance. Where an amicable resolution cannot be achieved, the Commission may make a decision on whether, in their opinion, there has been a breach of the law. If the complainant or the data controller disagrees with the Commissioner's finding, they have the right to appeal the decision to the Circuit Court. The DPC's main priority, if a complaint is upheld, is that the data controller complies with the law and puts right the matter concerned. If an organization does not voluntarily cooperate with an investigation, the DPC has powers of compulsion to require such cooperation.

In 2015, the Office received 932 complaints that were opened for investigation. Investigations into 1,015 complaints were concluded.

In 2018, Martin Meany, editor of Goosed.ie, filed a complaint to the DPC against the Diocese of Ossory stating he wished for his baptismal records to be deleted. The complaint started a subsequent "own volition enquiry" by the DPC into "whether the church's holding of personal data on baptisms and other Catholic sacraments that individuals may have taken falls under the EU's data protection law, the General Data Protection Regulation".

In 2022, Meany launched High Court Judicial Review proceedings against the DPC. He claims the DPC has failed to complete an investigation into his complaint against the Catholic Church.

In 2021, NOYB (None Of Your Business), an Austrian NGO founded by Max Schrems, filed a complaint against the DPC for corruption under Austrian law after the DPC demanded that the group sign a non-disclosure agreement in order to continue with their long-running complaint against Facebook. NOYB argued that the DPC could not demand favourable media coverage as the price of using its services.

In January 2023, DPC was forced to increase the fine issued to Meta Platforms after a review by European Data Protection Board found that the initial fine was insufficient. European Data Protection Board determined that DPC has failed to perform its enforcement responsibility with "due diligence". The critics have pointed out that 7 out of 8 decisions handed down by European Data Protection Board were against the Irish DPC, and that the DPC "always choose the most tortuous, lengthy and expensive legal route to a decision rather than a simple application of EU law".

In February 2026 the DPC opened an investigation into the Grok deepfake scandal under section 110 of the Data Protection Act 2018 as well as determining whether X violated the General Data Protection Regulation, including articles 5, 6, 25 and 35.

=== Audits ===
Section 10 (1A) of the Acts provides that "the Commissioner may carry out or cause to be carried out such investigations as he or she considers appropriate in order to ensure compliance with the provisions of this Act and to identify any contravention thereof." These investigations often take the form of audits of selected organizations. The aim of an audit is to identify any issues of concern about the way the organization under scrutiny manages personal data.

In 2015, the DPC carried out 51 audits and inspections of organizations in the public and private sectors.

== Enforcement ==
=== Offences under the Electronic Communications Regulations ===
The Data Protection Commission also investigates alleged breaches of the 2011 ePrivacy Regulations in Ireland. The offences relate primarily to the sending of unsolicited marketing communications by electronic means. The offences are punishable by fines – up to €5,000 for each unsolicited message on summary conviction and up to €250,000 on conviction on indictment. The DPC may bring summary proceedings for an offence under the Regulations.
