= Binding corporate rules =

Standard European data protection protocol for global use

Binding corporate rules (BCRs) allow multinational corporations, international organizations, and groups of companies to make intra-organizational transfers of personal data across borders in compliance with EU Data Protection Law. BCRs, developed by the European Union's Article 29 Working Party (today the European Data Protection Board), provide a framework for having different elements (internal legal agreements, policies, trainings, audits, etc.) that allow compliance with EU data protection regulations and privacy protection principles. The BCRs were developed as an alternative to the "standard contractual clauses" (SCCs), which apply in cases where more than one organisation contracts for the transfer of personal data, and the now defunct U.S. Department of Commerce's EU Safe Harbor (which was for US organizations only, but has been declared invalid).

== Approval ==
BCRs are required to be approved by the data protection authority in each EU member state (such as the CNIL in France and AEPD in Spain) in which the organization will rely on the BCRs. The EU has developed a mutual recognition process under which BCRs approved by one member state's data protection authority (known as the "lead" authority) and two other "co-lead" authorities, may be approved by the other relevant member states who may make comments and ask for amendments. Other members states, not part of mutual recognition process, will be also involved by the lead authority and will apply their independent review process within a limited time-frame. The overall process for BCR acceptance takes usually between 6 and 9 months. This time frame does not include the required Data Protection setup, which should be implemented within the company to comply with the current directive and its local implementation.

BCRs typically form stringent, intra-corporate global privacy policies, set of practices, processes and guidelines that satisfy EU standards and may be available as an alternative means of authorizing transfers of personal data (e.g., customer databases, HR information, etc.) outside of Europe. BCRs are considered the most "robust" and accepted regime for data transfers.

The United Kingdom continues (post-Brexit) to allow BCRs "to provide appropriate safeguards for making restricted transfers" subject to Article 47 of the UK GDPR. UK BCR's are subject to approval granted by the Information Commissioner's Office.

It has to be noticed that, while originally designed for providing legal ground to international transfers, BCRs became de facto a corporation demonstration of its capacity to comply "at large" with personal data processing requirements. A corporation having BCRs applies this framework independently of international transfers and should be seen as part of the "Corporate Governance" or "Data Governance".
