= Max Schrems =

Austrian author and privacy activist

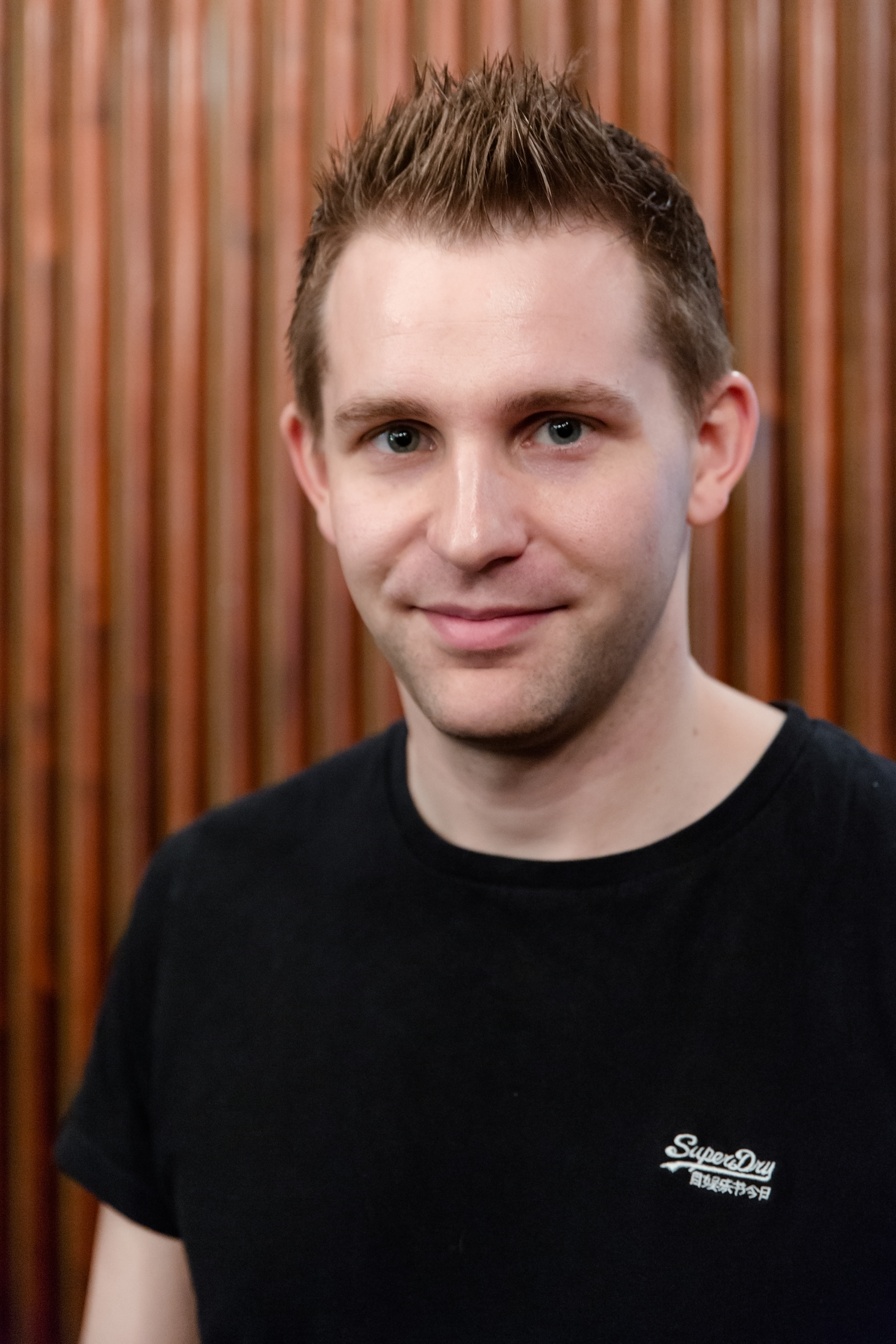
- Max Schrems in 2016
- Born: Maximillian Schrems; October 1987 (age 39); Salzburg, Austria
- Education: Law, University of Vienna
- Occupations: Lawyer, author, privacy activist
- Organization: NOYB – European Center for Digital Rights
- Known for: Privacy activism
- Website: schre.ms

Maximilian Schrems (born 1987) is an Austrian activist, lawyer, and author who became known for campaigns against Facebook for its privacy violations, including violations of European privacy laws and the alleged transfer of personal data to the US National Security Agency (NSA) as part of the NSA's PRISM program. Schrems is the founder of NOYB – European Center for Digital Rights.

== Prominent legal cases ==
=== Complaints with the Irish Data Protection Commissioner (2011) ===
While studying law during a semester abroad at Santa Clara University in Silicon Valley, Schrems decided to write his term paper on Facebook's lack of awareness of European privacy law, after being surprised by what the company's privacy lawyer, Ed Palmieri, said to his class on the subject. He later made a request under the European Right of access to personal data provision for the company's records on him and received a CD containing over 1,200 pages of data, which he published at europe-v-facebook.org with personal information redacted. He filed a first round of complaints against the company with the Irish Data Protection Commissioner (DPC) in 2011. In February 2012 Richard Allan and another company executive flew to Vienna to debate these complaints with him that lasted six hours. Facebook was audited under European law and had to delete some files and disable its facial recognition software. In 2014 Schrems took back the complaints, claiming that he never received a fair procedure before the Irish Data Protection Commissioner. He has never received a formal decision by the DPC and was denied access to all submissions by Facebook and the files of the case. On europe-v-facebook.org, he commented about taking back his complaints:

This decision was based on the fact that the Irish DPC has refused a formal decision for years and has not even granted the most basic procedural rights (access to files, evidence or the counterarguments). The DPC has factually stopped all forms of communication and ignored all submissions made. Many observers assumed that this may be based on political and economic considerations in Ireland."

=== Schrems I ===
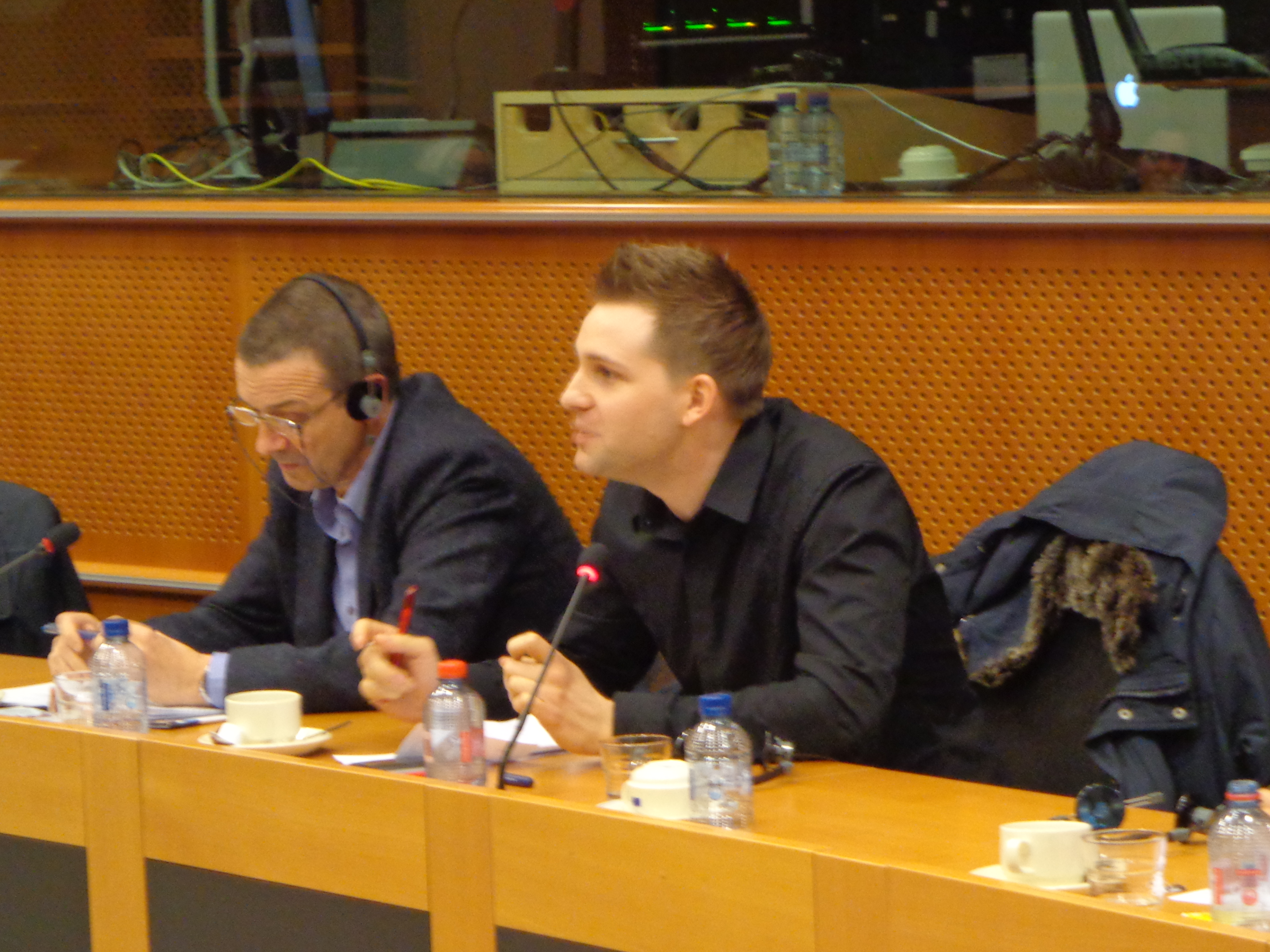
Max Schrems, 19 February 2012

In 2013 Schrems filed a complaint against Facebook Ireland Ltd with the Irish Data Protection Commissioner, Ireland being the country where Facebook has its European Headquarters. The complaint was aimed at prohibiting Facebook from further transferring data from Ireland to the United States, given the alleged involvement of Facebook USA in the PRISM mass surveillance program. Schrems based his complaint on EU data protection law, which does not allow data transfers to non-EU countries unless a company can guarantee "adequate protection". The DPC rejected the complaint, saying that it was "frivolous and vexatious" and that there was no case to answer. Schrems filed an application for judicial review in the Irish High Court over the inaction by the Irish DPC, which was granted. On 18 June 2014, Mr. Justice Hogan adjourned the case pending a reference to the Court of Justice of the European Union (CJEU). He said that Irish law relating to privacy had effectively been pre-empted by European law and that the core issue was whether the relevant directives should be re-evaluated in the light of the subsequent entry into force of Article 8 (protection of personal data) of the Charter of Fundamental Rights of the European Union.

The European Commission found in the executive decision 2000/520/EC that the so-called EU–US Safe Harbor Principles would provide "adequate protection" under Article 25 of Directive 95/46/EC (Data Protection Directive), when it comes to the transfer of personal information from the EU to the US. This executive decision by the European Commission was called into question by the 2013 Edward Snowden revelations. In essence Schrems therefore argued that the Safe Harbor system would violate his fundamental right to privacy, data protection and the right to a fair trial under the Charter of Fundamental Rights of the European Union.

The oral hearing before the European Court of Justice (ECJ) was held on 24 March 2015. The court's Advocate General for the case was Yves Bot. (Note: In new matters of law, the Court appoints an Advocate General to advise it. The Advocate General's opinion is non-binding on the Court and is not always followed by the Court. Thus in Costeja for example, the "right to be forgotten" case, the Court differed on both the material scope of the directive under consideration and the Advocate General's opinion that freedom of expression and information took precedence over any right to erasure, arguing that in the latter case a balancing of rights was required and that a right to erasure derived from the data-subject's rights enshrined in Articles 7 (respect for private and family life) and 8 (protection of personal data) of the Charter of Fundamental Rights of the European Union.) During the hearing, Bot asked the European Commission lawyer Bernhard Schima what advice he could give him if he was worried about his data being at the disposal of US authorities. Schima replied that he might consider closing down his Facebook account, if he had one. He said the European Commission was unable to guarantee that "adequate" safeguards for the protection of data are met, a remark that Schrems said was the most striking thing he heard at the hearing.

Bot delivered his opinion on 23 September 2015. He held the view that the Safe Harbor agreement was invalid and said that individual data protection authorities could suspend data transfers to third countries if they violated EU rights.

On 6 October 2015, the Court of Justice of the European Union ruled that, (1) national supervisory authorities still have the power to examine EU–US data transfers in spite of an existing Commission decision (such as its Safe Harbor Decision in 2000 which determined that US companies complying with the principles were allowed to transfer data from the EU to the US), and (2) the Safe Harbor framework is invalid. The Court found that the framework is invalid for several reasons: the scheme allows for government interference of the protections, it does not provide legal remedies for individuals who seek to access data related to them or have it erased or amended, and it prevents national supervisory authorities from exercising their powers. Under EU law, data-sharing with countries deemed to have lower privacy standards, including the US, are prohibited. Such activities will only be possible through more expensive and time-consuming methods.

On 2 December 2015, Schrems resubmitted his original complaint against Facebook with the Irish Data Protection Commissioner. He also sent similar complaints to the Hamburg and Belgian Data Protection Authorities, which both claim jurisdiction over Facebook. The complaints are designed to enforce the ECJ judgement on Facebook, which presently does not rely on Safe Harbor for its data transfers. Instead Facebook relies on pre-approved contractual agreements called "model clauses". Schrems argues that these agreements also incorporate exceptions for cases of illegal mass surveillance, and thus that the ECJ ruling applies to these agreements as well. The Irish Data Protection Commissioner took the view that Schrems had raised "well-founded" objections, but that it needs further guidance from the CJEU to determine the complaint.

After the proceedings in February/March 2017, Ms Justice Costello of the Irish High Court delivered the executive summary on 3 October 2017, referring the case to the CJEU.

"Neither the introduction of the Privacy Shield Ombudsperson mechanism nor the provisions of Article 4 of the SCC decisions eliminate the well-founded concerns raised by the DPC in relation to the adequacy of the protection afforded to EU data subjects whose personal data is wrongfully interfered with by the intelligence services of the United States once their personal data has been transferred for processing to the United States."

— Ms Justice Costello

=== 2014 Austrian class action ===
On 1 August 2014 Schrems filed a lawsuit against Facebook at the local Viennese courts. He enabled other Facebook users to join his case, generating a "class action" style suit, dubbed by the press as a David and Goliath suit, estimated as likely to be the largest class action privacy suit ever brought in Europe. Any Facebook user was able to assign his claim to Schrems via the fbclaim.com webpage. Within six days the participation in the suit was limited to 25,000 Facebook users, due to too many registrations, although other users could still register an interest. Schrems sued the Irish subsidiary of Facebook in the Vienna courts for a "token amount" of €500 in damages per participant. The case was financed by the German litigation funder ROLAND ProzessFinanz. According to the terms of fbclaim.com all awarded money would be forwarded to the individual participants. Schrems does not receive any financial benefit from the class action, but acts on a pro bono basis.

The first hearing took place on 9 April 2015. On 1 July 2015, the Vienna District Court dismissed the class-action, saying it had no jurisdiction. The Court's decision hinged on whether Schrems was merely a consumer of Facebook, since it was on that basis that Schrems was able to pursue a case in an Austrian civil court in his place of residence. Facebook accused Schrems in having a commercial interest in his numerous legal actions against Facebook. Judge Margot Slunsky-Jost said that Schrems could benefit off the enormous media interest in his future career. The Court ruled on procedural grounds that Schrems would consequently not qualify as a consumer and could not file at his home court in Vienna.

In October 2015, the Higher Regional Court of Vienna reversed the regional court ruling, finding that Schrems is a consumer and that he does not act in any commercial interest. The Higher Regional Court ruled that Schrems can bring his own claims against Facebook Ireland in Vienna, which constituted 20 of the 22 claims in the lawsuit, but is unable to form a class action for procedural reasons. This limited Schrems to bringing only a "model case". The Oberlandesgericht allowed an appeal to the Austrian Supreme Court in the key matter of forming a class action under EU and Austrian law. Schrems filed the appeal on 2 November 2015. Schrems won the battle, in the sense that Higher Regional Court of Vienna confirmed the judgment of the Regional Court for Civil Law Matters and Schrems received the EUR 500 token judgment from Facebook, but the war continues, since in Schrems' words, the regional courts "have not really dealt with many of the problems that this case raises." Specifically, while finding the Facebook violated DPD in this instance, they did not find against Facebook's assertion that it could use a contract of adhesion to define the limits of their data-handling obligations under the DPD. As of December 2020, Schrems referred the matter to the Austrian Supreme Court and hopes to take it onward to the European Court of Justice for a decisive judgment.

=== Complaints filed under GDPR in 2018–19 ===
Shortly after its coming into effect on 25 May 2018, Schrems filed suit under the newly promulgated General Data Protection Regulation (GDPR) in Ireland against Google and Facebook for coercing their users into accepting their data collection policies. Three complaints totalling over €3.9 billion were filed.

On 18 January 2019, Schrems filed further GDPR complaints against Amazon, Apple Music, DAZN, Filmmit, Netflix, SoundCloud, Spotify, and YouTube. His non-profit, noyb.eu, alleged they failed to respond, did not include sufficient background information, or provided insufficient or unintelligible raw data. noyb predicted a maximum total fine of €18.8 billion for the 8 companies.

=== Schrems II ===
At the conclusion of Schrems I, the Irish High Court officially referred the case (now called Data Protection Commissioner v Facebook Ireland and Maximillian Schrems) to the CJEU, along with eleven questions to address related to the validity of the SCC (standard contractual clauses). Judgement was presented on 16 July 2020.

"The CJEU ruled that the Privacy Shield does not provide adequate protection, and invalidated the agreement. The court also ruled that European data protection authorities must stop transfers of personal data made under the standard contractual clauses by companies, like Facebook, subject to overbroad surveillance. This decision has significant implications for U.S. Companies and for the U.S. Congress because it calls into question the adequacy of privacy protection in the United States."

— epic.org Press Release

"This is another landmark ruling for privacy rights by the Court of Justice, and a clear signal that the United States needs to reform its surveillance laws or risk losing its position as a global technology leader. Congress should act quickly to bring U.S. law in line with international human rights standards."

— Alan Butler, EPIC Interim Executive Director and General Counsel, in response to the judgement

In September 2020, Ireland's Data Protection Commission sent Facebook a preliminary order to stop transferring data from EU citizens to the US. A fine of 4% of annual revenue will be applied if the conditions are not met. Facebook's blog published a response letter by Nick Clegg, VP of Global Affairs and Communications, on 9 September 2020. Clegg acknowledged that the laws regarding data transfer are changing, yet still more legal clarity is needed for everyone involved, and advocated a revision to the Privacy Shield. Additionally, the response noted the seeming contradiction between the Privacy Shield, which applies to EU-US data transfers and the court invalidated, and the SCC, which apply to EU-3rd party countries and the court held still valid.

"A lack of safe, secure and legal international data transfers would damage the economy and hamper the growth of data-driven businesses in the EU, just as we seek a recovery from COVID-19. The impact would be felt by businesses large and small, across multiple sectors. In the worst case scenario, this could mean that a small tech start up in Germany would no longer be able to use a US-based cloud provider. A Spanish product development company could no longer be able to run an operation across multiple time zones. A French retailer may find they can no longer maintain a call centre in Morocco."

[...]

"The EU has led the way in establishing a framework for data protection that protects and empowers users. Privacy rules will continue to evolve, and global rules can ensure the consistent treatment of data wherever it is stored. Facebook therefore welcomes the efforts already underway between EU and US lawmakers to evaluate the potential for an "enhanced" EU-US framework – a Privacy Shield Plus. These efforts will need to recognise that EU Member States and the US are both democracies that share common values and the rule of law, are deeply culturally, socially and commercially interconnected, and have very similar data surveillance powers and practices"

— Nick Clegg

In March 2021 possible repercussions on trans-Atlantic intelligence services and surveillance have surfaced again. Citing national security and member states' rights, a new initiative has formed in an attempt to keep European intelligence services beyond court jurisdiction. EU member state governments, led by France, are seeking to insert a national security exemption into the pending ePrivacy Regulation that would exclude third-party states such as the U.S.

In May 2021 the Irish High Court rejected judicial review proceedings (brought by Facebook Ireland Limited) seeking to stop a preliminary draft decision (PDD) of the DPC. Facebook alleged a number of complaints, including procedural faults, unfair targeting of Facebook versus other data processors, and the failure of the court to answer questions by Facebook regarding the proceedings. Mr Justice David Barniville rejected each of Facebook's submissions and held the DPC's procedures were lawful; however, he did acknowledge that Facebook's questions regarding the proceedings should have been answered.

== NOYB - "None Of Your Business" ==
In 2017, Schrems co-founded NOYB. NOYB aims to launch strategic court cases and media initiatives in support of the General Data Protection Regulation (GDPR), the proposed ePrivacy Regulation, and information privacy in general. After 2017, many of the latest court cases he has been involved in have been brought forth by NOYB instead of Schrems personally.

== Publications ==
Schrems has authored the following books in German:

- Kämpf um deine Daten (Fight for your Data), 2014
- Private Videoüberwachung (Private Video Surveillance Law), 2011

== Awards and honors ==
- 2011: Defensor Libertatis of the Austrian Big Brother Awards.
- 2013: EPIC Privacy Champion Award by the US Privacy NGO EPIC
- 2013: Internet and Society Award (Oxford Internet Institute)
- 2015: Theodor-Heuss-Medal
- 2016: EFF Pioneer Award
- 2017: Forbes 30 under 30 Europe — Law & Policy 2017

== Notes ==
Notes
