= XÖV =

German framework for data-exchange standards in public administration

XÖV (from the German, "XML in public administration"; sometimes written XOEV) is a German framework for defining, governing and publishing data-exchange standards used by public authorities. It provides methods, rules and tooling for modelling and maintaining sector-specific specifications (the “XÖV standards”) to enable interoperable, machine-readable data exchange across federal, state (Länder) and local administrations, and between government and external parties.

== Overview ==
XÖV is an umbrella framework under which domain communities in the German public sector specify XML-based data models, code lists and exchange formats for their processes. Resulting specifications are published as XÖV standards (for example for population registers, justice, invoicing or environmental reporting). The framework aims to reduce duplication, promote re-use, and ensure that independently developed systems can interoperate.

== Governance and history ==
The framework is coordinated by the Koordinationstelle für IT-Standards (KoSIT, Coordination Office for IT Standards) on behalf of the IT Planning Council, the joint federal-state body that steers public-sector digitalization in Germany. KoSIT was established in the context of Germany's IT cooperation framework between the Federation and the Länder following constitutional and treaty changes in the late 2000s, and is based in Bremen.

Historically, the approach grew out of work on population-register data exchange (XMeld) in the early 2000s; the structured method used there was generalised into the XÖV framework and applied to other sectors.

== Development process and conformity ==
Methodological guidance for developing a new XÖV standard is set out in the XÖV-Handbuch (Handbook), which defines naming rules, modelling conventions and quality criteria. KoSIT also publishes an XÖV-Primer as a practical companion to the handbook.

Standards may undergo a formal XÖV certification managed within the federal IT standardisation process under the IT Planning Council. Conformance is assessed against the handbook's quality criteria to ensure consistent design and interoperability across domains.

== Repository and tools ==
Authoritative versions of XÖV standards and associated code lists are published via XRepository, a central online library operated for German public administration. The repository provides public access to models, XML schemas and documentation for re-use by administrations and vendors.

KoSIT also maintains open-source tooling used with some XÖV standards, such as an XML/Schematron validator employed by the German e-invoicing configuration.

== Scope and examples ==
XÖV covers sector-specific data exchanges across many domains. Examples include:

- XMeld, for resident register data exchange developed in the 2000s, whose approach informed the creation of the XÖV framework;
- XRechnung, Germany's application specification for electronic invoicing to public authorities in line with the European standard EN 16931;
- XUBetrieb (and related environmental models), for exchanging environmental reporting data with authorities.

== Relation to European standards ==
XÖV standards are aligned, where relevant, with European interoperability and sector standards. In e-invoicing, XRechnung implements Germany's CIUS of the European standard EN 16931 and is accepted by federal authorities; KoSIT also acts as the German Peppol Authority to support cross-border interoperability.

== See also ==
- E-government in Europe
- Electronic invoicing
- XML Schema
- Population register
