= Safe harbor (law) =

Type of legal provision

A safe harbor is a provision of a statute or a regulation that specifies that certain conduct will be deemed not to violate a given rule. It is usually found in connection with a more-vague, overall standard. By contrast, "unsafe harbors" describe conduct that will be deemed to violate the rule.

For example, in the context of a statute that prohibits vehicles from entering public parks "unless reasonably required by the circumstances", the exception introduces a necessarily flexible standard. The lawmaker can then specify objective circumstances that satisfy the standard, e.g. "emergency vehicles on official business are permitted in the park". This provision operates as a safe harbor: vehicles falling within it are permitted without requiring a case-by-case determination under the standard. Situations outside the safe harbor remain subject to the standard.

== Theoretical justifications ==
Safe harbors have been promoted by legal writers as reducing the uncertainty created by simply employing a vague standard (such as "reasonably required"). On the other hand, this type of rule formulation also avoids the problem of creating a precise rule that leaves a judge with no available discretion to allow for "hard cases". In theory, the safe harbor formulation can combine the virtues of vague standards and precise rules, allowing legislatures to prescribe with certainty the advance outcome for specific foreseeable cases, and to leave to judges to decide the cases that remain.

== United States ==
Safe harbor provisions appear in a number of laws and in many contracts. An example of safe harbor in a real estate transaction is the performance of a Phase I Environmental Site Assessment by a property purchaser: creating a "safe harbor" protecting the new owner if, in the future, contamination caused by a prior owner is found. Another common use of safe harbor is to protect management of a corporation from liability for making financial projections and forecasts in good faith.

The Digital Millennium Copyright Act (DMCA) has notable safe-harbor provisions in Title II which protect Internet service providers from the consequences of their users' actions.

In the context of the environmental protection, a voluntary safe harbor agreement can be undertaken between property owners and the United States Fish and Wildlife Service (FWS) or the National Oceanic and Atmospheric Administration (NOAA) under which a property owner undertakes actions that protect and aid the recovery an endangered species protected under the Endangered Species Act with habitat on their property. In exchange, the FWS or NOAA promises not to require any additional or different conservation activities on the property without the property holder's consent. When the agreement expires, the property owner is permitted to return the landscape to its original baseline condition if they so desire.

Safe harbor laws are being used across the United States to address how children are treated when they become victims of human trafficking and commercial sexual exploitation of children (CSEC). These laws are being used in New York, Florida and 20 other states (as of 2014) to "address the inconsistent treatment" that children receive after they are exploited sexually. The laws are used to ensure exploited children are treated as "victims", not as "criminals".

== European Union ==
The EU Electronic Commerce Directive specifies a safe harbor for "mere conduit", which protects Internet service providers from liability for user actions similarly to Title II of the US Digital Millennium Copyright Act.

Another example of a safe harbor decision can be found in the Data Protection Directive. The Data Protection Directive sets strict privacy protections for EU citizens. It prohibits (Note: See Data Protection Directive § Transfer of personal data to third countries.) European firms from transferring personal data to overseas jurisdictions with weaker privacy laws. Five years later, a decision created exceptions where foreign recipients of the data voluntarily agreed to meet EU standards under the International Safe Harbor Privacy Principles.

== Australia ==
Safe harbor legislation passed in September 2017, protect company directors from personal liability for insolvent trading if they take action likely to lead to a better outcome for the company and its creditors.

== India ==
In the context of the Income-tax Act, 1961, safe harbor rules refer to the determination of income deemed to accrue or arise in India under section 9(1)(i) of the Act, and the calculation of arm's length price under section 92C and 92CA of the Act. These rules provide guidelines under which tax authorities shall accept the transfer price or income declared by the assessee, on a presumptive tax basis. Multinational companies having international transactions with their group companies, declaring certain minimum operational profits, are not made subject to rigorous transfer pricing audits.

In the context of Information Technology Act, 2000, a safe harbor provision may refer to section 79 of the Act, that exempts online platforms from any legal liability for third-party content generated by its users and hosted by the platform, subject to several conditions.

== See also ==
- Section 230 – US federal law on legal liability of online computer services providers
