= Dashboard (disambiguation) =

A dashboard is a vehicle control panel.

Dashboard may also refer to:

== Computing and technology ==
- Dashboard (computing), a collection of data, often from different sources, displayed in a graphical user interface
- Dashboard (macOS), an Apple graphical component for hosting widgets (mini-applications)
- Dashboard of Sustainability, a software package designed to help developing countries achieve the Millennium Development Goals and work towards sustainable development
- Google Dashboard, an online management tool for registered users of Google applications
- Xbox Dashboard, a game console system menu

== Songs ==
- "Dashboard" (Modest Mouse song), 2007
- "Dashboard" (Noah Kahan song), 2026

== Other uses ==
- Dashboard (carriage) an upright board in front of a carriage to shield against dirt from horse's hooves* Harry Dashboard, pseudonym of the Irish-Australian poet James Riley (1795-ca.1860)
