= European Centre for Certification and Privacy =

European Research Organisation

The European Centre for Certification and Privacy (ECCP) is a European organization established in Luxembourg. Its mission is to support research and standardization in the field of data regulation and regulatory compliance.

ECCP is acting as scheme owner of Europrivacy, the European Data Protection Seal, which is the official European data protection certification under the General Data Protection Regulation (GDPR). According to Art. 42 GDPR, the purpose of this certification is to demonstrate "compliance with the GDPR of processing operations by controllers and processors". Europrivacy has been approved by the European Data Protection Board (EDPB) and is recognized across all EU and EEA Member States.

ECCP is also managing other certification schemes, such as:

- AI Act certification scheme;
- ePrivacy Directive certification criteria;
- Data Act certification criteria;
- Data Governance Act certification criteria;
- Trust Scale Levels (TSL).

ECCP is also actively engaged in European research on data regulation and regulatory compliance, including in areas such as data spaces and medical research.
