= Trust signals =

Aspect of online marketing strategy

Trust signals are evidence points that appear online to help customers feel more secure in their decision to purchase from a business or buy a product or service.

Trust signals were described in an article published in the March 2000 edition of the Journal of Computer-Mediated Communication as trust badges or seals from organizations such as the Better Business Bureau and TrustArc on e-commerce websites. At that time, consumers were more skeptical of providing their credit card information and other personal details to a website; trust signals helped visitors overcome their fears. A 2022 book, Trust Signals by Scott Baradell, was published on the subject.

In current internet marketing parlance, trust signals fall into three major categories:

- Trust signals that encourage visitors to complete a purchase or take an action;
- Trust signals elsewhere online that drive visitors to a website; and
- Trust signals that visitors might not notice, but that Google uses for ranking.

A 2019 neuroimaging study in the Journal of Interactive Marketing studied 29 subjects who participated in an experiment simulating an online purchase. The analysis revealed that seals of approval from third-party organizations were most trusted, whereas rating systems were less trusted because they elicited feelings of ambiguity and risk.

With the rise of generative AI chatbots like ChatGPT and Claude, Google AI Overviews, and Perplexity AI, trust signals have taken on a new dimension sometimes described as AI trust signals. Various research finds that earned media citations and domain authority are among the strongest predictors of brand inclusion in AI-generated answers.

== See also ==
- Privacy seal
- Trustmark (commerce)
- Trust seal
