= EPrivacy Regulation =

Proposed European Union regulation

The ePrivacy Regulation (ePR) is a proposal for the regulation of various privacy-related topics, mostly in relation to electronic communications within the European Union. Its full name is "Regulation of the European Parliament and of the Council concerning the respect for private life and the protection of personal data in electronic communications and repealing Directive 2002/58/EC (Regulation on Privacy and Electronic Communications)." It would repeal the Privacy and Electronic Communications Directive 2002 (ePrivacy Directive) and would be lex specialis to the General Data Protection Regulation. It would particularise and complement the latter in respect of privacy-related topics. Key fields of the proposed regulation are the confidentiality of communications, privacy controls through electronic consent and browsers, and cookies.

The history of the regulation goes back to January 2017 when the European Commission proposed the ePrivacy Regulation. The intention was that it would sit alongside the EU GDPR (General Data Protection Regulation) when it was introduced on 25 May 2018. The scope is still under discussion. According to some proposals, it would apply to any business that processes data in relation to any form of online communication service, uses online tracking technologies, or engages in electronic direct marketing.

The proposed penalties for noncompliance would be up to €20 million or, in the case of an undertaking, up to 4% of the total worldwide annual turnover, whichever is higher. The ePrivacy Regulation originally was intended to come in effect on 25 May 2018, together with the GDPR, but has still not been adopted.

== Difference between Regulation and Directive ==
The (new) ePrivacy Regulation will repeal the (current) ePrivacy Directive.

In contrast to an EU Directive, an EU Regulation is a legal act of the European Union that becomes immediately effective as law in all member states simultaneously.

The current ePrivacy Directive is a legal act of the European Union that requires member states to achieve a particular result without dictating the means of achieving that result. It has therefore been implemented into national laws and regulations. If the proposed ePrivacy Regulation became effective, these laws would be superseded and will (for reasons of clarity) likely be repealed. The ePrivacy Regulation would be self-executing and not require many implementing measures.

== Key points of Commission's proposal ==
According to the EU Commission, the proposal includes the following key changes:

- New players: Privacy rules will also apply to new players providing electronic communications services such as WhatsApp, Facebook Messenger, and Skype. That will ensure that the popular services guarantee the same level of confidentiality of communications as traditional telecoms operators.
- Stronger rules: All people and businesses in the EU will enjoy the same level of protection of their electronic communications through this directly applicable regulation. Businesses will also benefit from one single set of rules across the EU.
- Communications content and metadata: Privacy is guaranteed for communications like the time and the location of a call. Metadata have a high privacy component and must be anonymised or deleted if users did not give their consent unless the data is needed for billing.
- New business opportunities: Once consent is given for communications data (content and/or metadata) to be processed, traditional telecoms operators will have more opportunities to provide additional services and to develop their businesses. For example, they could produce heat maps indicating the presence of individuals, which could help public authorities and transport companies when developing new infrastructure projects.
- Simpler rules on cookies: The cookie provision, which has resulted in an overload of consent requests for internet users, will be streamlined. The new rule will be more user-friendly, as browser settings will provide for an easy way to accept or refuse tracking cookies and other identifiers. The proposal also clarifies that no consent is needed for non-privacy-intrusive cookies improving internet experience (like to remember shopping cart history) or cookies used by a website to count the number of visitors.
- Protection against spam: The proposal bans unsolicited electronic communications by emails, SMS, and automated calling machines. Depending on national law, people will either be protected by default or be able to use a do-not-call list to avoid receiving marketing phone calls. Marketing callers will need to display their phone number or use a special pre-fix that indicates a marketing call.
- More effective enforcement: The enforcement of the confidentiality rules in the regulation will be the responsibility of data protection authorities, already in charge of the rules under the General Data Protection Regulation.

== Reception ==
In February 2021, the German Federal Commissioner for Data Protection and Freedom of Information saw multiple red lines being crossed. Data retention had again become part of the proposal, despite the fact that it had been ruled unlawful by many courts. The regulations concerning the Internet constituted a step back in that cookie walls would be again allowed. Important consumer rights such as the "right to object" and "data protection impact assessment" would be voided. Personal data could be processed for purposes different from the original ones without the person's consent. The "pay-or-allow-to-be-tracked" question to access a website would henceforth be permitted. The directive of 2001 required in its art 15(1) that data might be retained for an important public interest. The proposal now in 17a does not have such a reference to the public interest anymore.

In March 2021, France was reported to be leading an effort to modify the ePrivacy initiative to exempt national security agencies from some provisions.

On July 6, 2021, the European Parliament approved a derogation to the ePrivacy regulation that enables providers of electronic communication services to scan and report private online messages containing material depicting child sex abuse, and allow companies to apply approved technologies to detect grooming techniques.

Three-way negotiations are currently underway between the EU Commission, the Parliament and the Council of the European Union to reach agreement on the final text of the regulation. It is expected to be finalized and come into effect in 2024
