= Lori Fena =

Lori Fena is an American internet activist, entrepreneur, and author, best known as the former director of the Electronic Frontier Foundation from 1995 to 1998 and author of "The Hundredth Window". Fena is currently the co-founder and VP of Business Development for Personal Digital Spaces and Founder and executive director of the Sustainable Information Economy.

== Business ==
Fena has a BSc in business information systems from California State University, Los Angeles. She worked in interactive video at a Pasadena engineering company, and managed the third-party software licensing business of Convergent Technologies (now Unisys). She launched Fena & Bates, an intellectual property consulting firm, in 1990 with Amy Bates when they both left Convergent. In 1993, she co-founded the Technology Board of Trade with Bates, which was an exchange for technology, including software, patents, and licenses. Fena sold the company to Corporate Software, which later became Stream International. Fena was VP of business development at Corporate Software/Stream, and continued as an investor with her husband Edward Zyszkowski, Joe Rizzi, and Thampy Thomas.

== Electronic Frontier Foundation ==
In September 1995, Fena was recruited to the Electronic Frontier Foundation (EFF) by Esther Dyson and John Gilmore to revitalize the activist organization and move its headquarters to Silicon Valley. Fena was executive director until January 1998, when she stepped down to return to private consultancy and was succeeded by Barry Steinhardt of the ACLU. She was EFF chairman from January 1998 – 2000. Fena launched the Silver Anvil Award-winning online grassroots Blue Ribbon Campaign for free speech, and founded and spun out TRUSTe.org, a non-profit web-seal organization that created and enforced the industry standard and EU safe harbor for online personal information.

Fena served as founder and chairman of TRUSTe.org from 1997 to 2002. She remained as Chairman Emeritus until the organization's assets were converted by the staff and board to a for-profit corporation in 2008. Fena was featured on CBS 60 Minutes and testified to congressional committees on privacy and intellectual property.

== Later work ==
In 2000 she became a member of Doubleclick's consumer privacy advisory board. Tara Lemmey said that "Lori strongly believes that it's important in every way possible to encourage businesses to do the most right thing in terms of consumer privacy and socially responsible business." She was also a partner in Exprise Investments. In 2003, Fena headed the Aspen Institute's Internet Policy Project on the Accountable Net. Fena served on the Board of Trustees of Norfolk Library. Fena authored reports and provided expert testimony in the landmark Federal Court Lanham Act case regarding deceptive advertising and online notice and consent mechanisms used in the collection and resale of college-bound students' personal information which was provided for admissions and financial aid.

Currently, Fena is the co-founder and Head of Business Development for Personal Digital Spaces, a cloud-based, blockchain-provenanced application services platform that provides real-time data management and monetization services.

== Book ==
Fena, Lori & Jennings, Charles. The Hundredth Window: Protecting Your Privacy and Security in the Age of the Internet (2000) Simon & Schuster Free Press.

Jason Catlett of Junkbusters.com argued that "It's really not a pro-privacy book." Massive Attack's album 100th Window was named after the book.

== Personal life ==
Fena is from Anchorage, Alaska. Her mother Nancy worked as a reservation agent with Wien Air Alaska, and her father James was in the USAF. She is married to Edward Zyszkowski, and has a daughter and son.
