= Trustmark (commerce) =

A trustmark is an image, logo, or badge that is typically displayed on an E-commerce website, indicating that the site has passed certain digital security tests or is operated by a member of a professional organization. The trustmark is intended to show approval of the brand by a recognizable third party. Customers gain confidence and may be more inclined to transact business with a brand bearing a trustmark.

One of the oldest familiar trustmarks, the Good Housekeeping Seal of Approval, was established in 1909 as a way for the magazine's Research Institute to endorse specific products backed by a two-year warranty. In the modern era, digital trustmarks can be a machine-readable authentication feature within an identity trust framework.

In the United Kingdom since 2006, there is a non-profit entity called TrustMark that under a master agreement from the Department for Business, Energy and Industrial Strategy licenses and audits businesses that register to carry out work inside and near residential homes. In Canada, there has been a trustmark issued by the Canadian Centre for Philanthropy (now Imagine Canada) to identify charities that meet standards of ethics and accountability. In 2018, Mozilla and a consortium including the New York University School of Law backed a product packaging trustmark called Trustable Technology. TRUSTe (now TrustArc) is another specialist in trustmark review services.

== See also ==
- Privacy seal
- Trust seal
- Trust signals
