= Tara Lemmey =

American entrepreneur, inventor, designer, technology expert and innovation strategist

Tara Lemméy
- Citizenship: United States
- Occupations: LENS, CEO and Founder; Markle Economic Future Initiative Entrepreneur

Tara Lemméy ( /ˈtærə ləˈmeɪ/TARR-ə lə-MAY) is an American entrepreneur and the founder and CEO of LENS Ventures, an investment firm based in San Francisco, California.

== Career ==
In 1998, Lemméy served on the board of TrustArc (then known as TRUSTe). In February 1999, she became the Executive Director of the Electronic Frontier Foundation, a position she held until 2009.

In 2005, Lemméy joined the U.S. Department of Homeland Security Privacy Advisory Committee. Two years later, she served as a Commissioner on the Embassy of the Future Task Force at the Center for Strategic and International Studies, representing Silicon Valley. In 2009, she participated in the U.S. State Department's Technology Delegation to Mexico, which explored ways for U.S. technology companies to assist Mexican citizens in addressing the country’s drug-related challenges.

Lemméy is a member of Rework America, part of the Markle Economic Future Initiative. She contributed to the Technology Working Group on the Markle Foundation's Task Force on National Security in the Information Age.

Lemméy is the Founder and CEO of LENS, an investment firm. She previously led Net Power & Light, which developed technology for video collaboration and live experiences. She participated at the Aspen Institute and contributed to the Aspen Round Table on Talent Development report.

Additionally, Lemméy has worked with the United States Department of State on international outreach, speaking on entrepreneurship and innovation in Switzerland and Turkey.

== Awards and honors ==
- Fast Company MCP 1000: Most Creative People in Business
- Fast Company 100 Most Creative People in Business in 2013
- Profiled in The Power of Pull: How Small Moves, Smartly Made, Can Set Big Things in Motion
