= Dashboard of Sustainability =

MDG / Sustainabilty software

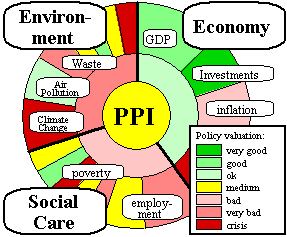
Dashboard of Sustainability screenshot: A number of indicators in the outer circle are combined to three sub-themes; the sub-themes are then condensed to a Policy Performance Index, PPI

The Dashboard of Sustainability is a free-of-charge, non-commercial software package configured to convey the complex relationships among economic, social, and environmental issues. The software is designed to help developing countries achieve the Millennium Development Goals and work towards sustainable development. The software package was developed by members of the Consultative Group on Sustainable Development Indicators (CGSDI), and has been applied to quite a number of indicator sets, inter alia to the Millennium Development Goals indicators and the United Nations Commission on Sustainable Development indicators.

In 2002, Dashboard of Sustainability researchers Jochen Jesinghaus and Peter Hardi presented the Dashboard of Sustainability at the Johannesburg Summit and the 2002 World Social Forum in Porto Alegre. It was also included in the resources for the OECD World Forum on Key Indicators.

In January 2006, the Millennium Project utilized the Dashboard of Sustainability to conclude in their "State of the Future" report that global prospects for improving the overall health, wealth, and sustainability of humanity are slowly improving. In February 2006, it was proposed that the Dashboard of Sustainability be utilized to combine and represent two or more of the following five frameworks presently used for developing sustainability indicators: domain-based, goal-based, issue-based, sectoral, and causal frameworks.

MDG Dashboard screenshot showing gender equality map of Africa

== Known applications (external links) ==
Translating a spreadsheet into a dashboard is relatively straightforward, see The Manual, and numerous indicator sets have been translated into the dashboard format. While many of them are not publicly available, the following applications have been put online by their authors.

=== Applications with global scope ===
Millennium Development Goals Indicators Dashboard - see screenshot to the right and the online demo

Sustainable Development Indicators Dashboard (UN CSD set)

UNESCO/SCOPE Policy brief on Sustainable Development

Maternal and Neonatal Program Effort index (MNPI)

=== Applications with national scope ===
- Australia: National Land & Water Resources Audit, Sydney Regional Innovation Dashboard
- Azores regional dashboard
- Brazil: National multiannual plan (Plano Plurianual, PPA), Rural sustainability, Lages, Mato Grosso
- Greece regional dashboard
- India/West Bengal Monitoring of Public Health Progress
- Italy: Sicily waste management, agriculture indicators, Bienno, Bologna’s Ecological Footprint, Ecosistema Urbano, Padua, Liguria, Regional wellbeing indices, Varese PTCP
- Estonian National Strategy on Sustainable Development and Estonian regional dashboards
- Switzerland Regional Dashboard
- Tanzania Districts Dashboard
- Sustainable Development in the United States: An Experimental Set of Indicators
