= Data Act (European Union) =

EU regulation on promoting the exchange and use of data

Regulation (EU) 2023/2854
- European Union regulation
- Text with EEA relevance
- Title: Regulation (EU) 2023/2854 of the European Parliament and of the Council of 13 December 2023 on harmonised rules on fair access to and use of data and amending Regulation (EU) 2017/2394 and Directive (EU) 2020/1828 (Data Act)
- Made by: European Parliament and Council of the European Union
- Made under: Article 114 of the TFEU
- Journal reference: L, 2023/2854, 22 December 2023

History
- Date made: 13 December 2023

Preparative texts
- Commission proposal: COM/2022/68 final - 2022/0047/COD

The Data Act is a European Union regulation (Regulation (EU) 2023/2854 of the European Parliament and of the Council) which aims to facilitate and promote the exchange and use of data within the European Economic Area.

The act was published in the Official Journal of the European Union on 22 December 2023.

== History ==
The European Commission was expected to formally present the act in the fourth quarter of 2021. The provisions on switching between data processing services were preceded by the SWIPO (Switching Cloud Providers and Porting Data) initiative, established in the context of Article 6 of Regulation (EU) 2018/1807 on the free flow of non-personal data. SWIPO developed separate codes of conduct for Infrastructure as a Service (IaaS) and Software as a Service (SaaS).. When preparing the Data Act, the European Commission assessed the existing self-regulatory approach related to the Free Flow of non personal Data Regulation. Its impact assessment recorded limited uptake of the SWIPO codes and found that they concentrated mainly on pre-contractual transparency rather than removing all technical and economic obstacles to switching. The Commission considered policy options ranging from improving the existing voluntary framework to introducing binding requirements for switching between data processing services. Notwithstanding, the proposal was formally issued on 23 February 2022.

European (harmonised) standards may be drafted by the European Standardization Organizations (ESOs) following standardisation requests from the European Commission in order to support the application of the requirement that 'products shall be designed and manufactured, and related services shall be provided, in such a manner that data generated by their use are, by default, easily, securely and, where relevant and appropriate, directly accessible to the user'. In addition, European standards and technical specifications in the meaning of Article II of Regulation (EU) 1025/2012 on European Standardisation may also support the issuing of "standard" contracts or transparency on how data will be used.

A draft of the proposed act had earlier been leaked on 2 February 2022, and was swiftly opposed by industry.

If implemented in its proposed form the Act would impact on data rights current under Directive 96/9/EC of the European Parliament and of the Council of 11 March 1996 on the legal protection of databases (the Database Directive). As adopted, Article 43 provides that the sui generis right of Article 7 of that directive does not apply when data is obtained from or generated by a connected product or related service falling within the scope of the regulation.

On 27 June 2023, the Council and the European Parliament reached a provisional agreement on the final version. This was adopted by the Council on 27 November 2023 and published in the Official Journal of the European Union on 22 December 2023.

Since October 2026, certified dispute settlement bodies provide independent, impartial, and transparent alternative dispute resolution (ADR) services for conflicts arising under the European Union's Data Act, particularly those involving data access, data sharing, and fair, reasonable, and non-discriminatory (FRAND) terms and conditions.

Under the Data Act framework, these bodies address several categories of disputes, including:

- Disagreements over FRAND data-sharing terms and associated compensation.
- Disputes concerning the refusal or restriction of data access, such as those involving the protection of trade secrets.
- Conflicts between cloud service providers and customers regarding statutory customer rights and provider obligations.

Certified dispute settlement bodies are required to issue a written decision accompanied by a statement of reasons within 90 days of receiving a request. These decisions are not automatically binding unless both parties explicitly agree to adopt the decision as binding before proceedings start.

The first entity to be accredited as a certified dispute settlement body was ADROIT (registered as RGOAL Ltd.), which was certified by the Malta Digital Innovation Authority (MDIA) to operate across the European Union.

== Timeline ==
Article 50 of the regulation sets its application dates; Article 29 sets the dates for switching charges.

- 11 January 2024: the Data Act entered into force, on the twentieth day after its publication in the Official Journal. From that day until 12 January 2027, providers of data processing services may impose only reduced switching charges, capped at the costs directly linked to the switching process.
- 12 September 2025: general application. Users can request access to the data generated by their connected products and related services and have the data shared with third parties.
- 12 September 2026: connected products and related services placed on the market after this date must be designed so that their data are, by default, accessible to the user and, where relevant and technically feasible, directly accessible.
- 12 January 2027: providers of data processing services may no longer impose any switching charges, including data egress charges, on customers for the switching process.
- 12 September 2027: the rules on unfair contractual terms (Chapter IV) also apply to contracts concluded on or before 12 September 2025 that are of indefinite duration or due to expire at least ten years from 11 January 2024.

== See also ==
- Data Governance Act
- General Data Protection Regulation
- Artificial Intelligence Act
- Digital Services Act
- Digital Markets Act
- European Health Data Space
- SWIPO (cloud computing)
