= Harry Dashboard =

Pen-name of the Australian newspaper poet identified as James Riley (1795–ca.1860)

James Riley
- Born: ca. 1795; Cork, Ireland
- Died: ca. 1860
- Occupation: Poet
- Writing career
- Language: English
- Years active: 1832-1860

Harry Dashboard, pen-name of the Australian newspaper poet identified as James Riley (c. 1795–ca.1860), who also wrote under other pseudonyms including "Felix."

== Early years ==
James Riley (or Ryley) was born in Cork, Ireland, in about 1795. In 1824 he was tried at the Old Bailey in London for the theft of two shillings, convicted and sentenced to seven years transportation, arriving in New South Wales in August 1825 aboard the convict transport "Minstrel." Assigned to Rev. Thomas Reddall at Campbelltown as a labourer (though he was a clerk by calling), and then to Major George Druitt at Mount Druitt, probably as a schoolmaster, Riley was granted his Certificate of Freedom in 1831.

Through the 1830s and early 1840s Riley published verse – mainly comic and satirical – in Sydney newspapers, either anonymously or under various pseudonyms including J. R., Dick Lightpate, A Child of Song, Owen Bulgruddery, Felix M’Quill, Caleb Menangle and Felix. During this time he became associated with the Hume family, explorers and settlers of southern New South Wales. He was schoolmaster to the children of Francis Rawdon Hume (brother of Hamilton Hume) at Rockwood, Appin, and to the family of Hume relative George Barber at Glenrock, Marulan. Riley published several poems dedicated to Hume family members, most notably an elegy for Barber, drowned trying to cross flooded Towrang Creek in a winter storm in 1844, and a lament for John Kennedy Hume, killed in a fight with bushranger Thomas Whitton in the streets of Gunning on 20 January 1840.

== Fisher’s Ghost ==
Frederick Fisher disappeared from his Campbelltown farm in June 1826. Foul play was suspected, and a police search led by Aboriginal tracker Gilbert finally found his remains in a boggy creek nearby. Fisher’s friend George Worrall was accused of his murder, tried and hanged in 1827. The affair was reported in the newspapers of the day, but James Riley’s verse account was the first to introduce a new and sensational element based on local rumour: the appearance of the ghost of the murdered man on a Campbelltown bridge, pointing to where his body would be found. The story of Fisher’s Ghost continues to exert a fascination today. Riley’s poem "The Sprite of the Creek!" first appeared anonymously in 1832 and again – this time with an explanatory letter and extensive footnotes – under the pen-name Felix in 1846.

== Felix’s comic verse ==
As Felix, Riley also produced comic verse, most notably two serio-comic epics, "The Luprechaun; or, Fairies' Shoemaker, An Irish Legend of '98" and "Billy McDaniel; or, 'The Ould Fellow' Balked. An Irish Legend", an Asmodean tale in which Billy rescues a young bride at a country wedding from the clutches of the devil. It is likely that Riley was also the "Felix McQuill" who wrote "The Luckless Journey; or, One Half Pint Too Much", a cautionary tale set in the time of Governor Macquarie. However Felix's crowning achievement was arguably the Humbuggawang Despatches, a series of prose and song satires on New South Wales politics of the 1840s and '50s, particularly the progressive causes of extension of the franchise, a halt to the transportation of convicts, separation from British rule and a federated Australian republic. The despatches are in the language (and eccentric spelling) of stockman-poet Tim Donohue, Felix's uproarious Irish-Australian friend, from the wilds of the Murrumbidgee River. The sporting and satirical newspaper Bell's Life in Sydney carried twenty despatches over the years 1847 to 1859.

== The Gundagai flood ==
Riley’s most widely-known piece – and the only published one to which he attached his name – was "The Gundagai Calamity," a lament for the destruction of the town of Gundagai in the Murrumbidgee River flood of the night of 24 June 1852. It was written at Francis Rawdon Hume’s home Castlesteads, at Boorowa, only a few weeks after the events described. The poem would reappear regularly in NSW newspapers over the next eighty years.

== Harry Dashboard ==
Around 1848, Riley adopted the pen-name "Harry Dashboard", a term he took from the board at the front of a carriage which shielded its occupants from the muck dashed up by the horses. Harry wrote comic and satirical verse from places in the Murrumbidgee region of southern NSW: Boorowa, Gunning, Bobbera and "Yassville" (probably an imaginary place in or near Yass), and his work appeared mainly in Goulburn and Yass newspapers. His subjects are sometimes local – the woeful state of the roads and bridges, the eccentricities of Brummy the coach driver, a mock ode for the local policemen – but the best are satires on colonial politics and prominent figures: the gold mania, Chinese immigration, speculation in railways, the absurd Bunyip aristocracy proposal of W. C. Wentworth, the demagoguery of John Dunmore Lang and sly digs at the work of Harry's poetical rivals Henry Parkes and Charles Harpur.

Riley’s last poem as Harry Dashboard was published in 1860. His fate is not known with certainty, but the evidence of his former pupil Mary Bozzom Kennedy, daughter of Francis Rawdon Hume, suggests that Riley died "alone and friendless" around that year. Despite the fact that his work was confined to the newspapers, Riley’s output shows him to be a fine humourist, an adroit rhymester and a sharp commentator on matters local and national. His work has yet to be properly recognised.

== Selected individual works ==
Anonymous

- "The Sprite of the Creek!" (1832)

As Felix

- "Lines...to the memory of John Kennedy Hume, Esq." (1842)
- "The Horseman Who Faced the Storm" (1845)
- "The Sprite of the Creek, Revised and Accompanied by Notes" (1846)
- "Billy McDaniel; or, 'The Owld Fellow' Balked (Cantos I & II)" (1847)
- "Billy McDaniel; or, 'The Owld Fellow' Balked (Cantos III & IV)" (1847)
- "Billy McDaniel; or, 'The Owld Fellow' Balked (Cantos V & VI)" (1847)
- "Billy McDaniel; or, 'The Owld Fellow' Balked (Canto VII)" (1847)
- "Billy McDaniel; or, 'The Owld Fellow' Balked (Canto VIII)" (1847)
- "Billy McDaniel; or, 'The Owld Fellow' Balked (Canto IX)" (1847)
- "Billy McDaniel; or, 'The Owld Fellow' Balked (Canto X)" (1847)
- "Humbuggawang Despatch No. 3: Scene from the Murrumbidgee Operatics"
- "Humbuggawang Despatch No. 5: Tim Donohue's Swarry!"
- "Humbuggawang Despatch No. 7: Tim Donohue's Third Swarry! Prefaced by the Gigantic Railway Spec. and contemplated Monster Cod-Fishing Establishment!!"

As Felix McQuill

- "The Luckless Journey; or, One Half Pint Too Much (Canto I)"
- "The Luckless Journey; or, One Half Pint Too Much (Canto II)"
- "The Luckless Journey; or, One Half Pint Too Much (Canto III)"

As Harry Dashboard

- A Brummisode
- "A Few Words of a Sort," Addressed to Time
- A Razorbackantigo
- Mammon's Arrival (A Gold Ditty)
- A Fun-o-scopic View of Our Peerage
- The Luprechaun: or Fairies' Shoemaker (Part 1)
- The Luprechaun: or Fairies' Shoemaker (Part 2)

As James Riley

- "The Gundagai Calamity"

== Sources ==
- Reddall family - papers, 1808-1897, undated (A 423), State Library of NSW.
- "Elegiac Pieces by Felix", in Papers of Hamilton Hume, 1840-1855 (MS 3575), National Library of Australia.
- Kennedy, Mary, Recollections of an Australian squatter's wife, 1838-1912 (A 2105), State Library of NSW.
- Trove Digitised Newspapers, National Library of Australia.
- Hadgraft, Cecil, and Elizabeth Webby, "More Substance to Fisher’s Ghost?", Australian Literary Studies, 3:3, May 1968, pp. 190–200.
- Webby, Elizabeth, Literature and the Reading Public in Australia, 1800-1850, Vol. 3, PhD diss., University of Sydney, 1981, pp. 76–7.
- Vening, Chris, "Harry Dashboard and Fisher's Ghost", Script & Print: Bulletin of the Bibliographic Society of Australia and New Zealand, 39:3, 2015, pp. 133–62; includes bibliography (via BSANZ).
