= Europrivacy =

Europrivacy is a comprehensive certification scheme designed to assess and verify compliance with the General Data Protection Regulation (GDPR).

Developed in the context of the European research program, Europrivacy criteria have been approved by the European Data Protection Board (EDPB) to serve as European Data Protection Seal under Art. 42 GDPR. It is formally and legally recognized by the 30 EU and EEA Member States.

Europrivacy is managed by the European Centre for Certification and Privacy (ECCP) in Luxembourg and maintained by the Europrivacy International Board of Experts in data protection. It is supported by an ecosystem of experts, research institutions, and official partners, including certification bodies, law firms, consulting firms, and solution providers.

As European Data Protection Seal, the use of Europrivacy is subject to the GDPR dispositions. Research has led to the development of an international and geographically neutral version of the Europrivacy criteria that can be used outside of the GDPR, under the name of Interprivacy. It addresses the requirements of the main international and regional data protection regulations, including the Convention 108+ of the Council of Europe, the EU GDPR, the Global CBPR Framework, the Malabo convention, the ASEAN Framework for Data Protection, the EU-US Data Privacy Framework (DPF), and the Personal Data Protection Standards for Ibero-American States.

== Recognition and accreditation ==
Since October 2022, Europrivacy has been officially recognized across all EU Member States by the European Data Protection Board (EDPB) as a European Data Protection Seal. This recognition ensures that certified organizations are compliant and continue to be compliant with GDPR standards. The framework provides a standardized approach to privacy compliance, which supports multinational companies in demonstrating adherence to data protection standards.
