= EPrivacy Directive =

European Union directive regarding data protection

Directive 2002/58/processing of personal data and the protection of privacy in the electronic communications sector
- European Union directive
- Made by: European Parliament & Council
- Made under: Art. 95
- Journal reference: L201, 2002-07-31, pp. 37 – 47

History
- Date made: 2002-07-12
- Entry into force: 2002-07-31
- Implementation date: 2003-10-31

Preparative texts
- EESC opinion: C123, 2001-01-24, p. 53
- EP opinion: C187, 2002-05-30, p. 103
- Reports

Other legislation
- Replaces: —
- Amends: —
- Amended by: Directive 2006/24/EC, Directive 2009/136/EC
- Replaced by: —

Privacy and Electronic Communications Directive 2002/58/EC on Privacy and Electronic Communications, otherwise known as ePrivacy Directive (ePD), is an EU directive on data protection and privacy in the digital age. It presents a continuation of earlier efforts, most directly the Data Protection Directive. It deals with the regulation of a number of important issues such as confidentiality of information, treatment of traffic data, spam and cookies. This Directive has been amended by Directive 2009/136, which introduces several changes, especially in what concerns cookies, that are now subject to prior consent.

There are some interplays between the ePrivacy Regulation (ePR) and the General Data Protection Regulation (GDPR). Some EU lawmakers had hoped the ePrivacy Regulation (ePR) could come into force at the same time as the GDPR in May 2018. In this way, it would repeal the ePrivacy Directive 2002/58/EC and accompany the GDPR in regulating the requirements for consent to the use of cookies and opt-out options.

== Subject-matter and Scope ==
The Electronic Privacy Directive has been drafted specifically to address the requirements of new digital technologies and ease the advance of electronic communications services. The Directive complements the Data Protection Directive and applies to all matters which are not specifically covered by that Directive. In particular, the subject of the Directive is the "right to privacy in the electronic communication sector" and free movement of data, communication equipment and services.

The Directive does not apply to Titles V and VI (Second and Third Pillars constituting the European Union). Likewise, it does not apply to issues concerning public security and defence, state security and criminal law. The interception of data was however covered by the EU Data Retention Directive, prior to its annulment by the Court of Justice of the European Union.

Contrary to the Data Protection Directive, which specifically addresses only individuals, Article 1(2) makes it clear that ePrivacy Directive also applies to legal persons.

== Main provisions ==
The first general obligation in the Directive is to provide security of services. The addressees are providers of electronic communications services. This obligation also includes the duty to inform the subscribers whenever there is a particular risk, such as a virus or other malware attack.

The second general obligation is for the confidentiality of information to be maintained. The addressees are Member States, who should prohibit listening, tapping, storage or other kinds of interception or surveillance of communication and "related traffic", unless the users have given their consent or conditions of Article 15(1) have been fulfilled.

=== Data retention and other issues ===
The directive obliges the providers of services to erase or anonymise the traffic data processed when no longer needed, unless the conditions from Article 15 have been fulfilled. Retention is allowed for billing purposes but only as long as the statute of limitations allows the payment to be lawfully pursued. Data may be retained upon a user's consent for marketing and value-added services. For both previous uses, the data subject must be informed why and for how long the data is being processed.

Subscribers have the right to non-itemised billing. Likewise, the users must be able to opt out of calling-line identification.

Where data relating to location of users or other traffic can be processed, Article 9 provides that this will only be permitted if such data is anonymised, where users have given consent, or for provision of value-added services. Like in the previous case, users must be informed beforehand of the character of information collected and have the option to opt out.

=== Unsolicited e-mail and other messages ===
Article 13 prohibits the use of email addresses for marketing purposes. The Directive establishes the opt-in regime, according to which unsolicited emails may be sent only with prior agreement of the recipient. A natural or legal person who initially collects address data in the context of the sale of a product or service, has the right to use it for commercial purposes provided the customers have a prior opportunity to reject such communication where it was initially collected and subsequently. Member States have the obligation to ensure that unsolicited communication will be prohibited, except in circumstances given in Article 13.

Two categories of emails (or communication in general) will also be excluded from the scope of the prohibition. The first is the exception for existing customer relationships and the second for marketing of similar products and services. The sending of unsolicited text messages, either in the form of SMS messages, push mail messages or any similar format designed for consumer portable devices (mobile phones, PDAs) also falls under the prohibition of Article 13.

=== Cookies ===
The Directive provision applicable to cookies is Article 5(3). Recital 25 of the Preamble recognises the importance and usefulness of cookies for the functioning of modern Internet and directly relates Article 5(3) to them but Recital 24 also warns of the danger that such instruments may present to privacy. The change in the law does not affect all types of cookies; those that are deemed to be "strictly necessary for the delivery of a service requested by the user", such as for example, cookies that track the contents of a user's shopping cart on an online shopping service, are exempted.

The article is technology neutral, not naming any specific technological means which may be used to store data, but applies to any information that a website causes to be stored in a user's browser. This reflects the EU legislator's desire to leave the regime of the directive open to future technological developments.

The addressees of the obligation are Member States, who must ensure that the use of electronic communications networks to store information in a visitor's browser is only allowed if the user is provided with "clear and comprehensive information", in accordance with the Data Protection Directive, about the purposes of the storage of, or access to, that information; and has given their consent.

The regime so set-up can be described as opt-in, effectively meaning that the consumer must give their consent before cookies or any other form of data is stored in their browser. The UK Regulations allow for consent to be signified by future browser settings, which have yet to be introduced but which must be capable of presenting enough information so that a user can give their informed consent and indicating to a target website that consent has been obtained. Initial consent can be carried over into repeated content requests to a website. The Directive does not give any guidelines as to what may constitute an opt-out, but requires that cookies, other than those "strictly necessary for the delivery of a service requested by the user" are not to be placed without user consent.

=== Criticism of the EU cookie consent law ===
EU cookie consent banners are pop-ups or notifications on websites asking whether users will accept browser cookies. The ePrivacy Directive requires websites to get explicit consent from users before storing cookies on their devices. Despite their intended privacy benefits, cookie consent banners are widely regarded as a nuisance. Users are constantly bombarded with these banners on almost every website they visit, disrupting their browsing experience. Europeans collectively lose approximately 575 million hours each year clicking through cookie consent banners mandated by EU law.

== Literature ==
1. Full text of Directive
2. Guidance from the UK's ICO
3. Guidance from the French DPA CNIL (Translated into English)
4. Article 29 Data Protection Working Party Opinion 2/2010
5. Article 29 Data Protection Working Party Opinion 16/2011
6. History of the decision making
7. On spam: Asscher, L, Hoogcarspel, S.A, Regulating Spam: A European Perspective after the Adoption of the ePrivacy Directive (T.M.C. Asser Press 2006)
8. Edwards, L, "Articles 6 – 7, ECD; Privacy and Electronics Communications Directive 2002" in Edwards, L. (ed.) The New Legal Framework for E-Commerce in Europe (Hart 2005)
