= Google Dashboard =

Google service

In computing, Google Dashboard lets users of the Internet view and manage personal data collected about them by Google. With an account, Google Dashboard allows users to have a summary view of their Google+, Google location history, Google web history, Google Play apps, YouTube and more. Once logged in, it summarizes data for each product the user uses and provides direct links to the products. The program allows setting preferences for personal account products.

The only information that is shared with Google Dashboard is information generated while one is logged into an account. All data in Dashboard is considered private unless settings are changed. Google allows the user control of all the information that they provide and allows the data submitted to be purged from each app.

Two step verification, web history, location history, and preferences are available for all applications.

== Usage ==
To access, users sign into a Google account with username and password. Once signed in, select Google account settings option in top right corner of the web page and then click on the Dashboard link titled View data stored with the account. After verifying account password, users can view Dashboard organized according to the products of use. From Dashboard, users will also be able to view data associated with the account.

Some applications link to new sections, while other settings stay within the page. The user also has access, from the dashboard, to special settings. Two-step verification is an example of this, which requires a verification code to be entered that is sent to the user's phone when logging into a new machine and every-time cookies are cleaned.

== Purpose ==
=== Privacy and convenience ===
The main purpose of Google Dashboard is to provide a central place for people to see what data has been collected about them. Google Dashboard also provides users with a way to manage their account for each service they use. Links are located next to each service, meaning that if a user wanted to manage their Gmail account, a direct link to their account management page will be located in their Google Dashboard. Using that link will enable users to manage their privacy settings or sharing options on the video site. Google Dashboard enables users to gain access to the company's most often used services, such as Google+, Google search, Google Maps, YouTube and many more. These items are all supported by Dashboard and as the user scroll through them, Dashboard displays all the account settings for each service and any recent activity. For example, Dashboard will show appointments on the Google Calendar, messages in the Gmail inbox, recently shared or viewed documents from Google Docs, and status in Google Chat, among other updates.

If a user is uncomfortable with the presence of their Google web history, they can remove specific items or clear the entire history using their Google Dashboard. Every service listed in a user's Dashboard also includes a link to that service's privacy policies.
