= Data Governance Act =

EU Regulation establishing a framework for the exchange and use of data

Regulation (EU) 2022/868
- European Union regulation
- Text with EEA relevance
- Title: Regulation (EU) 2022/868 of the European Parliament and of the Council of 30 May 2022 on European data governance and amending Regulation (EU) 2018/1724 (Data Governance Act)
- Made by: European Parliament and Council of the European Union
- Made under: Article 114 of the TFEU
- Journal reference: L 152, 3 June 2022, p. 1–44

History
- Entry into force: 23 June 2022
- Applies from: 24 September 2023

Preparative texts
- Commission proposal: COM/2020/767 final - 2020/0340/COD

The Data Governance Act (DGA) is a regulation of the European Union on the sharing and re-use of data. Adopted on 30 May 2022 as Regulation (EU) 2022/868, it entered into force on 23 June 2022 and has applied since 24 September 2023. It was the first legislative measure announced under the European strategy for data to reach adoption.

On 30 November 2021, the EU Parliament and Council reached an agreement on the wording of the DGA. Following its adoption, it was published in the Official Journal of the European Union on 3 June 2022.

The regulation creates no right to obtain data, and it does not oblige public bodies to open their holdings. Its distinctive move lies elsewhere: firms whose business is to broker data between others become a notified category, bound by neutrality rules that no earlier instrument had imposed on them. Three years after adoption the European Commission proposed to repeal the DGA and move much of its substance into an amended Data Act; that procedure was still open in September 2026.

== Main provisions ==
Chapter II concerns public sector data that falls outside the ordinary open-data regime because it is protected by commercial or statistical confidentiality, third-party intellectual property, or data-protection law. Where re-use is permitted, the conditions must preserve that protection (by anonymisation or other disclosure control, by remote access to a secure processing environment, or by access on the body's own premises).

Chapter III subjects providers of data intermediation services to notification of a competent national authority, framed as a declaration rather than an authorisation : no administrative decision is required before a notified provider may begin. Chapter IV opens a voluntary register to not-for-profit entities collecting data, without reward beyond costs, for objectives of general interest such as scientific research, healthcare or action on climate change. Two further elements sit across the whole text: the European Data Innovation Board, an expert group set up by Articles 29 and 30, and Article 31, which requires public bodies, re-users, intermediaries and recognised altruism organisations to resist transfers of non-personal data to third-country authorities where Union or national law would be breached.

== Effect on market actors ==
The intermediation regime is what bites. Article 12 requires the service to be supplied through a separate legal person; the provider may not use the data passing through it for other purposes, and data generated by the service only to improve that service; access procedures and commercial terms must be fair, transparent and non-discriminatory. Practitioners reading the text in 2022 placed data marketplace operators squarely inside the category, consent management platforms probably inside it, and advised ad-tech firms to examine their position closely (the obligations implying separate incorporation, activity logs and FRAND licensing terms). The category is narrower than data sharing at large : supplying technical tools such as cloud storage or analytics does not make a service an intermediary unless it seeks to establish commercial data sharing relationships. Heiko Richter has discussed Gaia-X in this context, describing it, depending on its design, as a possible example of the kind of intermediary the DGA addresses.

Take-up has been poor. A study supporting the Commission's evaluation of the DGA, the Open Data Directive and the Regulation on the free flow of non-personal data reported delayed national implementation and low uptake of both the intermediation and the altruism models, attributing this in part to unclear incentives, and recommended stronger national coordination, more harmonised definitions and clearer operational guidance.

== Criticism ==
Whether the neutrality regime assists the intermediaries it was meant to encourage, or handicaps them, has been the central dispute. Gabriele Carovano and Michèle Finck find a tension between the ambition of a competitive data economy and the organisational constraints placed on the firms expected to build it, arguing that the rules may favour one particular model of intermediation. Lukas von Ditfurth and Gregor Lienemann put the question in their title — promoting or restricting? Richter holds that intermediaries remain poorly integrated into the wider market order for data sharing and that the boundary of the regulated category is still uncertain. Jukka Ruohonen and Sini Mickelsson dwell instead on the administrative and enforcement resources the framework demands, and on the complexity of anonymisation.

Article 31 drew an objection of a different order. Writing for the Datasphere Initiative in 2022, Francesco Vogelezang argued that the regulation liberalises data circulation inside the Union while restricting it outwards, noting that European officials had been explicit about wanting European firms to profit from European data; he quoted Antonio Casilli's remark that one country's digital sovereignty is another's digital colonialism. Earlier commentary had concentrated on the fit with data-protection law: a 2021 white paper from the KU Leuven Centre for IT and IP Law identified uncertainty over lawful bases and over the relationship between the new DGA actors and existing data-protection institutions, Mireille van Eechoud examined how the re-use rules sit alongside the Database Directive, and Lusine Vardanyan and Hovsep Kocharyan analysed the overlaps with the GDPR. Thomas Streinz has placed the regulation within a wider body of European data law reaching beyond privacy into questions of access and infrastructure.

== Proposed repeal ==
On 19 November 2025 the Commission presented the Digital Omnibus. COM(2025) 837 final would repeal the DGA outright, together with the Open Data Directive, the Regulation on the free flow of non-personal data and the Platform-to-Business Regulation, moving the intermediation and altruism regimes into a new chapter of the Data Act and restructuring the rules on protected public-sector data. Some of those rules would change in the process, not merely move: notification of data intermediation services would become voluntary registration, and the requirement of a legally separate entity would give way to functional separation. Bárbara da Rosa Lazarotto reads the redesign as a shift towards a more market-facilitating approach, set against the more institutional model of the original regulation.

The package met opposition before it was published. On 13 November 2025, 127 civil society organisations, trade unions and public-interest groups (among them Access Now, Amnesty International, Article 19, European Digital Rights, Privacy International and NOYB), signed a statement calling the forthcoming proposals the biggest rollback of digital fundamental rights in EU history; their objections bore on the GDPR, the ePrivacy rules and the AI Act rather than on the data governance provisions. The European Data Protection Board and the European Data Protection Supervisor adopted Joint Opinion 2/2026 on the package in February 2026. The file is being handled under procedure 2025/0360(COD), jointly in Parliament by the committees on Industry, Research and Energy and on Civil Liberties, Justice and Home Affairs; as of 13 September 2026 the Legislative Observatory listed it as awaiting a committee decision.

== See also ==
- Data Act (European Union)
- General Data Protection Regulation
- Open Data Directive
