= List of formerly proprietary software =

This is a list of notable software packages which were published under a proprietary software license but later released as free and open-source software, or into the public domain.

In some cases, the company continues to publish proprietary releases alongside the non-proprietary version.

List of formerly proprietary and closed-source software
Title	Original release	Relicensed release	Initial free relicense	Notes
3D Movie Maker	1995	2022	MIT	The source code and assets for entire program (minus fonts) was uploaded to GitHub on 4 May 2022, under the MIT License.
Adobe Flex	2004	2007	MPL-1.1	Since renamed to Apache Flex and changed to Apache-2.0
AdvFS	1990s	2008	GPL-2.0-only	HP opened up AdvFS from Tru64 UNIX.
AOLserver		1999	GPL / modified MPL	
Apache Derby	1996	2004	Apache-2.0	Relational database management system originally called Cloudscape; released as free and open-source software by IBM in 2004 and donated to the Apache Software Foundation
Apache Wave	2009	2009	Apache-2.0	Formerly Google Wave.
Apus Game Engine	2008	2020	BSD-3-Clause	Released to the public by the developer after reaching a Patreon goal. The source code for Astral Heroes (one of the games using the engine) was released to patrons.
Astrolog	1991	2015	GPL-2.0-or-later / custom permissive	Has always been freeware and open source, but had a custom attribution demanding permissive license.
Atom	2014	2014	MIT	
BASIC Computer Games	1973	2021	Public-domain software (Unlicense)	On 31 December 2021, Jeff Atwood published an updated version of the 101 games included in the original BASIC Computer Games on GitHub under the Unlicense, with permission of David H. Ahl. On 15 June 2022, Ahl formally released everything he had ever written or edited, from prose to software, into the public domain; which includes titles like More BASIC Computer Games and BASIC Computer Adventures.
BDS C Compiler	1979	2002	Public domain	Released by author
BitKeeper	2000	2016	Apache-2.0	
Bitstream Vera (font)		2003	custom	Through the efforts of Bitstream and the GNOME Foundation
Blades of Exile	1997	2007	CPL-1.0	Relicensed to the GPL-2.0-only at some point between 14 May 2007 and 12 June 2007.
Blender	1996	2003	GPL-2.0-or-later	
BlitzBASIC (Blitz3D, BlitzPlus, BlitzMax)	2001	2014	Zlib	BlitzPlus was released as open source on 28 April 2014 under the Zlib license on github.com. Blitz3D follow on 3 August 2014. BlitzMax was open sourced on 21 September 2015.
BRender	1995	2022	MIT	Source code for 1997 and 1998 versions released under the MIT License on GitHub on 3 May 2022. The source code for 3D Movie Maker, a computer program using the engine was also released under the same license.
C-Dogs	1999	2002–2016	Public-domain software/CC BY 3.0	Source code released to the public on 13 February 2002, under a public-domain-equivalent license. The graphics were re-licensed to the CC BY 3.0 license on 13 April 2016.
Cafu Engine	2000	2009	GPL-3.0-or-later	Originally released under the GPL-3.0-or-later license (with an option for a commercial license), in 2016 was re-licensed under the MIT license.
Catacomb	1989	2014	GPL-2.0-or-later	
Catacomb II	1991	2014	GPL-2.0-or-later	
Catacomb Abyss	1992	2014	GPL-2.0-or-later	
Catacomb Armageddon	1992	2014	GPL-2.0-or-later	
Catacomb 3D	1991	2014	GPL-2.0-or-later	
C*Base	1980s	2003	GPL-2.0-or-later	
Cemu	2015	2022	MPL-2.0	Source code released under the Mozilla Public License 2.0 on 24 August 2022.
Command & Conquer: Renegade	2002	2025	GPL-3.0-or-later	
Command & Conquer: Generals – Zero Hour	2003	2025	GPL-3.0-or-later	
Command & Conquer 3: Tiberium Wars	2007	2025	GPL-3.0-or-later	
Command & Conquer 3: Kane's Wrath	2008	2025	GPL-3.0-or-later	
Command & Conquer: Red Alert 3	2008	2025	GPL-3.0-or-later	
Command & Conquer: Red Alert 3 – Uprising	2009	2025	GPL-3.0-or-later	
Command & Conquer 4: Tiberian Twilight	2010	2025	GPL-3.0-or-later	
ChakraCore	2009	2016	MIT	On 13 January 2016 Microsoft released ChakraCore under the MIT license on GitHub. ChakraCore is essentially the same as the Chakra engine that powers the Microsoft Edge browser, but with platform-agnostic bindings, i.e. without the specific interfaces utilised within the Windows Universal App platform.
CMU Sphinx		2000	Custom BSD-style license	
CodeXL		2016	MIT	
Coherent	1980	2015	BSD-3-Clause	
CP/M family	1974	1997, 2001, 2014		
CuneiForm	1993	2008	BSD-3-Clause	Optical character recognition software
Dagor Engine	2003	2023	BSD-3-Clause	Gaijin Entertainment's in-house game engine was quietly released on GitHub under a BSD license in 2023; this open-source release will be used as the base for VK's Nau Engine.
Dink Smallwood	1998	2003	zlib-like	Some game data (e.g. sounds) not released under a free license.
DOS.MASTER	end 1980s	2000	Public-domain software	DOS.MASTER is a program for Apple II computers which allows Apple DOS 3.3 programs to be placed on a hard drive or 3.5-inch floppy disk and run from ProDOS. Written by Glen Bredon as a commercial program during the late 1980s, it was released into the public domain by his family after the author's death.
Duke Nukem 3D	1996	2003	GPL-2.0-or-later	Game code only, no data, no engine.
Elasticsearch	2021	2024	AGPL-3.0-only	Originally Apache licensed; taken proprietary to pressure AWS; then added AGPL
Etherpad	2008	2009	Apache-2.0	Open sourced after being purchased by Google
Extensible Storage Engine	1994	2021	MIT	Formerly known as JET Blue
Falcon		2007	GPL	
FAR Manager	1996	2007	BSD-3-Clause	Version 2.0 released as open source.
File Manager (Windows)	1990	April 2018	MIT	On 6 April 2018, Microsoft released binaries and the source code, licensed under the MIT license, for an improved version of File Manager able to be run on Windows 10. This version included changes such as the ability to compile in modern versions of Visual Studio, the ability to compile as a 64-bit application, and numerous usability improvements.
Fish Fillets	1998	2002	GPL-2.0-or-later	
Free Download Manager	2003	2007	GPL-3.0-only	Free since version 2.5
FoundationDB	2013	2018	Apache-2.0	Apple Inc. acquired the founding company in March 2015 and discontinued downloads of the software. In April 2018, Apple open-sourced the database and resumed downloads.
Game-Maker	1991	2014	MIT	After some consultation with the user base, on 12 July 2014 original coder Andy Stone released the Game-Maker 3.0 source code on GitHub, under the MIT license.
GGPO	2006	2019	MIT	On 9 October 2019 Cannon announced on his Twitter account that GGPO was now open source and available under the MIT license.
Ghostery	2010	2018	MPL-2.0	Cliqz GmbH acquired Ghostery from Evidon, Inc. in February 2017. Ghostery's software was open-sourced on 8 March 2018.
GEM family	1985	1999	GPL	Development continued as OpenGEM and FreeGEM.
Gentium (font)	2002	2005	OFL	Through the efforts of SIL International
Gigablast	2000	2013	Apache-2.0	
Glitch	2011	2013	CC0	After Glitch was officially shut down on 9 December 2012, the artwork and most of the source code was released under the CC0 license on 18 November 2013. On 9 December 2014, a fan project to relaunch Glitch under the name Eleven began alpha testing.
GLX	1990s	2008	SGI FreeB License	
GW-BASIC	1983	2020	MIT	
Haaf's Game Engine	2004	2005	LGPL-2.0	Originally released under the LGPL-2.0 license on 25 November 2005, the following year it was re-licensed under the Zlib license. On 7 August 2011, the source code used for the Mac OS X and Linux ports of Hammerfight was also released.
Hovertank 3D	1991	2014	GPL-2.0-or-later	
ILWIS	1988	2007	GPL-2.0-only	Released as free and open-source software by ITC.
Doom engine	1993	1999	GPL-2.0-or-later	The released version is the source code to Doom. Originally released under a restrictive license on 23 December 1997. The sources for Heretic and Hexen: Beyond Heretic (other two games using the Doom engine) were released under the GPL-2.0-only license. The source code for the Atari Jaguar version of Doom was released under the non-free Doom Source License. The source code for the 3DO Interactive Multiplayer port of Doom was released under the MIT License.
Quake engine	1996	1999	GPL-2.0-or-later	The released version is the source code to Quake. The map sources were also released under the GPL in 2006. In 2000 the source for Hexen II (another game using the id Tech 2 engine) was released under the GPL-2.0-only license.
id Tech 2	1997	2001	GPL-2.0-or-later	The released version is the source code to Quake II.
id Tech 3	1999–2001	2005–2010	GPL-2.0-or-later	The released version is the source code to Quake III Arena. The source code for other id Tech 3 games, such as Star Wars Jedi Knight II: Jedi Outcast, and Star Wars Jedi Knight: Jedi Academy was also released.An updated version of the engine was released in 2010 under the GPL-3.0-or-later license. The released version is the source code to Return to Castle Wolfenstein and Wolfenstein: Enemy Territory.
id Tech 4	2004–2012	2011–2012	GPL-3.0-or-later	The released version is the source code to Doom 3. Changes to the code had to be made to avoid use of the patented Carmack's Reverse. An updated version of the engine was released in 2012 under the GPL-3.0-or-later license. The released version is the source code to Doom 3: BFG Edition.
Impulse Tracker	1995	2014	BSD-3-Clause	Jeffrey Lim released the source code to Impulse Tracker as part of its 20th anniversary, with the main source code released on 19 October and sound driver source code released on 25 December.
Inform	1993	2022	Artistic-2.0	Source code for Inform 7 v10.1.0 released on GitHub under the Artistic-2.0 license on 28 April 2022.
JaikuEngine	2006	2009	Apache-2.0	
Java	1995	2006–2007	GPL-2.0-only	On 13 November 2006, Sun Microsystems released much of Java as free software under the terms of the GPL-2.0-only license. On 8 May 2007 Sun finished the process, making all of Java's core code free and open-source, aside from a small portion of code to which Sun did not hold the copyright.
Jumper 2.0	2007	2008	GPL	Publicly announced on 29 September 2008,
Komodo IDE	2000	2022	MPL-1.1	Open-sourced on 8 December 2022, by ActiveState due to variety of factors, including the deprecation of XUL and XULRunner and the market situation.
KornShell	1982	2000	custom; now CPL	
Le Lisp	1981	2020	BSD-2-Clause	
LightZone	2005	2012	BSD-3-Clause	Company went out of business
Linux kernel	1991	1992	GPL-2.0-only	Very early versions (before 0.12) of the Linux kernel used a license that prohibited commercial distribution, which is not compliant with free software or open source definitions
Lugaru	2005	2010–2016	GPL-2.0-or-later/CC BY-SA 3.0	Source code released by Wolfire Games upon the success of the original Humble Indie Bundle under the GPL-2.0-or-later license. On 21 November 2016, all of the assets (including those of Lugaru HD) were released under the Creative Commons Attribution-ShareAlike 3.0 Unported license.
Maelstrom	1992	1995–2010	GPL-2.0-or-later/CC BY 3.0	Source code for the Simple DirectMedia Layer Linux port by Sam Lantinga released under the GNU GPL v2 on 7 December 1999. On 15 April 2010, Andrew Welch and Ian Gilman allowed the assets to be re-licensed under the Creative Commons Attribution 3.0 license.
Marathon 2: Durandal	1995	2000	GPL-2.0-or-later	Only the code was released under the GPL-2.0-or-later license. Now known as Aleph One
Marathon Infinity	1996	2011	GPL-3.0-or-later	
Mari0	2012	2018	MIT	Developed using the LÖVE framework and originally available under the CC BY-NC-SA 3.0 license, it was relicensed to the MIT license on 29 September 2018.
MiniPanzer and MegaPanzer			GPL	The source code of the programs was released under the GPL in 2009 by their author, who retained the copyright.
MINIX	1987	2000	BSD-3-Clause	
Motif	1980s	2012	LGPL-2.1-or-later	
Movable Type	2001	2007	GPL	Weblog software
MP/M family	1979	1997, 2001		
MS-DOS 1.25, 2.0, 4.0	1982–1983	2018–2024	MIT	Originally uploaded by the Computer History Museum in 2014 under a non-commercial license, on 28 September 2018, Microsoft uploaded the source code to GitHub under the MIT license. On 25 April 2024, Microsoft released the source code for MS-DOS 4.0 in collaboration with IBM.
.NET Framework (most components)	2002	2014	MIT, Apache-2.0, BSD license	Starting in 2014 Microsoft released most of their .NET ecosystem software (.NET Micro Framework, .NET Compiler Platform, ASP.NET, Entity Framework, NuGet etc.) under FOSS licenses and shifted the code to a GitHub repository.
NetBeans	1997	2007	GPL, CDDL	An integrated development environment (IDE) for Java and other programming languages
Netscape Enterprise Server		2009	BSD	Sun Microsystems open sourced it.
Netscape Navigator/Communicator	1994	1998	MPL	See Mozilla
OpenGL sample implementation	1992	2008	SGI FreeB License	
Open Sound System	1992	2007	GPL-2.0-only, CDDL-1.0	
OpenWRT	?	2003	GPL	As Linksys built the firmware for their WRT54G wireless router also from GPL'ed code, they were required to make the source code available in July 2003.
Performance Co-Pilot	1993	1999	GPL, LGPL	
PhysX	2001	2018	BSD-3-Clause	
Pinball Construction Set	1982–1983	2013	MIT	Source code for the Atari 8-bit port was released by Bill Budge on 12 February 2013 upon the recovery by Electronic Arts of the original floppies containing the source code. On 24 February 2013, the source code for the original Apple II version was released.
Plan 9 from Bell Labs	1992/1995–2000	2021	MIT	Applies to all the four original versions by Bell Labs. The first two editions were not released to the general public. The Third Edition was released in 2000 under the Plan 9 License, a license not approved by the Free Software Foundation and the Open Source Initiative. The Fourth Edition was released in 2002 under the LPL-1.02 license, a free and open-source software license, and relicensed to the GPL-2.0-only license on 8 February 2014, by the University of California, Berkeley with the permission of Alcatel-Lucent, the copyright holders at the time.
PowerShell	2006	August 2016	MIT	Open sourced by Microsoft in August 2016 on GitHub.
Qt	1991	1999	QPL	First released as open source under the QPL license. Later released under the GPL license. Qt 4.5 and later are released under the LGPL license. Until 2005 the Windows version was only under a proprietary license.
RakNet	2003	2014	BSD-2-Clause	Oculus VR acquired RakNet and open-sourced it shortly after.
Rebol	1997	2012	Apache-2.0	Following the discussion with Lawrence Rosen, the Rebol version 3 interpreter was released under the Apache-2.0 license on 12 December 2012.
Rise of the Triad	1994	2002	GPL-2.0-or-later	Only the code was released under the GPL-2.0-or-later license.
Ryzom	2004	2010	AGPL-3.0-or-later	
Sandboxie	2004	2020	GPL-3.0-or-later	The final 5.40 version was a source code-only release, published a year after Sophos announced its discontinuation of development.
Second Life client	2003	2007	GPL-2.0	
Second Reality	1993	2013	Public-domain software (Unlicense)	Released by Jussi Laakkonen, former member of Future Crew, to celebrate the 20th anniversary of the original release.
SimCity	1989	2007	GPL-3.0-or-later	Free version released as 'Micropolis'
Solar2D	2009	2019	GPL-3.0	Originally released under the GPL-3.0 license (with an option for a commercial license), the following year it was re-licensed under the MIT license.
Solaris	1989	2005	CDDL	Free version released as OpenSolaris, which was discontinued in 2010. Forked as Illumos.
Soldat	2002	2020	MIT/CC BY 4.0	Originally limited to the game engine, assets followed shortly after under CC BY 4.0 license.
Source Code Control System	1972	2006	CDDL	
StarOffice	1986	2000	LGPL/SISSL	Free version released as OpenOffice.org, later released only under the LGPL license. (OpenOffice.org was discontinued in 2011, but forks—most prominently LibreOffice (licensed under the MPL-2.0 license) and Apache OpenOffice (licensed under the Apache-2.0 license)—have become its dominant successors.) StarOffice was still released separately under a proprietary license, using mostly the same code, until its discontinuing in 2011; Sun required all contributors to the main OpenOffice.org project assign joint copyright to Sun.
Star Ruler 2	2015	2018	MIT / CC BY-NC 2.0	Source code and assets re-released to the public (except for music, which is kept proprietary). The assets are under a non-free CC BY-NC 2.0 license.
Stride	2014	2014	GPL-3.0	Originally released under the GPL-3.0 license (with an option for a commercial license), it became proprietary in 2017, and it was re-licensed to the MIT license in 2018.
Super Lemonade Factory	2012	2012–2021	MIT/GPL-3.0-only	Source code for the Adobe AIR (Microsoft Windows/Mac OS X) and Flixel (iOS) versions was released on 27 July 2012 on GitHub under the MIT License, the assets were included but were not free. The entire source code repository for the Ouya version was released on 4 February 2021 under the GPL-3.0-only license.
Symbian platform	1998	2010	EPL	
Synfig	2001	2005	GPL-2.0-or-later	Some more information is available on the Synfig history page.
Tesseract OCR	1985	2005	Apache-2.0	Released as free and open-source software by HP and UNLV
TextSecure	2010	2011	GPL-3.0	Since renamed to Signal
Torque 2D/iTorque 2D	2006–2009	2013	MIT	A combination of Torque 2D and iTorque, named Torque 2D MIT, was released under the MIT license by GarageGames. The source code for Larva Mortus, a game using the engine, was released on 1 May 2009 under a non-free non-commercial license.
Torque 3D	2001	2012	MIT	Developed for Tribes 2. Released as free and open-source software by GarageGames.
TurboCASH	1985	2003	GPL	
Two Tribes Engine	2007	2021	GPL-2.0-only	On 17 December 2021, Two Tribes released the source code to their in-house game engine under the terms of the GPL-2.0-only license (with an option for a proprietary license).
Ancient UNIX (Version 6 Unix, Version 7 Unix, UNIX/32V)	1971–1979	2002	BSD-4-Clause	The source code for the versions 1 to 7 of Unix and UNIX/32V was re-licensed by Caldera International (later SCO Group) under the BSD-4-Clause free-software license.
ViewMAX	1990	1999	GPL	
Visual Studio Code	2015	2015	MIT	
Warzone 2100	1999	2004	GPL-2.0-or-later	Video game by Eidos Interactive
Watcom C compiler	1988	2003	Sybase Open Watcom Public License	Free version released as Open Watcom under a license which is considered non-free by the GNU project but acceptable by the OSI.
Windows Calculator	1985	2019	MIT	Windows 1.0, released in November 1985, included the first iteration of Windows Calculator. In March 2019, Microsoft released the source code of Windows Calculator under the MIT license.
Windows Console		2019	MIT	In 2019, the Windows Console infrastructure was open-sourced under the MIT license, alongside Windows Terminal.
Windows Live Writer	2012	2015	MIT	An open source fork of Windows Live Writer was released as Open Live Writer by Microsoft on 9 December 2015.
Wintermute Engine	2003	2009	LGPL-3.0-or-later	Source code released upon request under the LGPL-3.0-or-later license with the release of the version 1.8.9. Publicly available under the terms of the MIT license since 23 March 2013. The source code for The White Chamber, a game using the engine, was released on 30 June 2008 under a non-free CC BY-NC-SA 2.0 UK license.
Wire	2014	2016	GPL-3.0	
Wolfenstein 3D engine	1992		GPL-2.0-or-later	Originally released under a restrictive license on 21 July 1995, it was relicensed to the GPL at some point. The source code for Rise of the Triad and Blake Stone: Planet Strike (two games using the engine) was also released under the GPL-2.0-or-later.
Worms?	1983	2021	MIT	
XMind	2007	2008	EPL and LGPL	Mindmapping software based on the Eclipse RCP
YSFlight	1999	2022	BSD-3-Clause	
ZFS	~2001	2005	CDDL	Released by Sun Microsystems under an open-source license in 2005. Due to a FSF announced license incompatibility of the GPL with the CDDL, ZFS wasn't directly integrated in Linux, but in the BSDs or MacOS due to their permissive licensed kernel which offers better license compatibility. After the later owner Oracle didn't release after version 28, the community forked to OpenZFS.
Zork I, Zork II, Zork III	1980–1982	2025	MIT	On 20 November 2025, Microsoft licensed the already publicly available source code for Zork I, Zork II and Zork III under the MIT license, while noting that this does not extend to any trademarks.

== See also ==
- History of free and open-source software
- List of commercial video games with available source code
- List of free and open-source software packages
- List of free and open-source web applications
- List of proprietary source-available software
- List of formerly free and open-source software
