= Ghostery =

Free and open-source browser extension and mobile browser app

- Developers: David Cancel; Cliqz International GmbH
- Release: 2009; 17 years ago
- Stable release: Browser extension: 10.6.12 / 10 November 2026; Android: 2.4 / March 21, 2019; 7 years ago; iOS: 2.1.0 / October 30, 2018; 8 years ago
- Operating system: Browser extension; Android; iOS
- License: MPL 2.0
- Website: www.ghostery.com
- Repository: github.com/ghostery/ghostery-extension

Ghostery is a free and open-source privacy and security-related browser extension and mobile browser application. Since February 2017, it has been owned by the German company Cliqz International GmbH (formerly owned by Evidon, Inc., which was previously called Ghostery, Inc. and the Better Advertising Project). The code was originally developed by David Cancel and associates.

Ghostery enables its users to detect and control JavaScript "tags" and "trackers" to remove JavaScript bugs and beacons that are embedded in many web pages which allow for the collection of a user's browsing habits via HTTP cookies, as well as participating in more sophisticated forms of tracking such as canvas fingerprinting.

As of 2026, Ghostery is available for Mozilla Firefox, Google Chrome, Brave, Microsoft Edge, Opera, Vivaldi, Safari, iOS, Android, and Firefox for Android.

Additionally, Ghostery's privacy team creates profiles of page elements and companies for educational purposes.

== Functionality ==
=== Blocking ===
Ghostery blocks HTTP requests and redirects according to their source address in several ways:

1. Blocking third-party tracking scripts that are used by websites to collect data on user behavior for advertising, marketing, site optimization, and security purposes. These scripts, also known as "tags" or "trackers", are the underlying technology that places tracking cookies on consumers' browsers.
2. Continuously curating a "script library" that identifies when new tracking scripts are encountered on the Internet and automatically blocks them.
3. Creating "Whitelists" of websites where third-party script blocking is disabled and other advanced functionality for users to configure and personalize their experience.

When a tracker is blocked, any cookie that the tracker has placed is not accessible to anyone but the user and thus cannot be read when called upon.

=== Reporting ===
Ghostery reports all tracking packages detected, and whether Ghostery has blocked them or not, in a "findings window" accessible from clicking on the Ghostery Icon in the browser. When configured, Ghostery also displays the list of trackers present on the page in a temporary purple overlay box.

== History and use ==
Originally developed by David Cancel, Ghostery was acquired by Evidon (renamed Ghostery, Inc.) in January 2010. Ghostery is among the most popular browser extensions for privacy protection. In 2014, Edward Snowden suggested consumers use Ghostery along with other tools to protect their online privacy. Ghostery, Inc. made their software source code open for review in 2010, but did not release further versions of the source code after that. On February 22, 2016, the company released the EULA for the Ghostery browser extension, as a proprietary closed-source product.

Cliqz GmbH acquired Ghostery from Evidon Inc. in February 2017. Cliqz is a German company majority-owned by Hubert Burda Media. Ghostery no longer shares data of any kind with Evidon.

On March 8, 2018, Ghostery shifted back to an open source development model and published their source code on GitHub, saying that this would allow third-party contributions as well as make the software more transparent in its operations. The company said that Evidon's business model "was hard to understand and lent itself to conspiracy theories", and that its new monetization strategy would involve affiliate marketing and the sale of ad analytics data.

In May 2018, in the distribution of an email promoting changes to Ghostery's practices to comply with General Data Protection Regulation (GDPR), hundreds of user email addresses were accidentally leaked by listing them as recipients. Ghostery apologized for the incident, stating that they stopped the distribution of the email when they noticed the error, and reported that this was caused by a new in-house email system that accidentally sent the message as a single email to many recipients, rather than sending it individually to each user.

After that Cliqz GmbH has closed, Ghostery Gmbh has become current owner of Ghostery business. And a confirmation of business continuity can also be derived from their location that is still at same address of former Cliqz GmbH company, and because Jean-Paul Schmetz, previous founder of that same former company is currently directing it together with Heinz Spengler.

In December 2024 it was announced that the Ghostery Private Browser (formerly Dawn) will be discontinued.

== Features ==
=== Ad-Blocking ===
Ad-Blocking includes banners, pop-ups, and video ads.

=== Anti-Tracking ===
Added from Cliqz after owning Ghostery, it uses a heuristic, AI approach to determine if those trackers are sending unsafe data.

=== Never-Consent ===
This feature stops cookie pop-ups by automatically rejecting unneeded third-party cookies and preserves user privacy.

== Criticism ==
Under its former owner Evidon, Ghostery had an opt-in feature called GhostRank. GhostRank took note of ads encountered and blocked, then sent that information back to advertisers who could then use that data to change their ads to avoid further being blocked; although this feature is meant to incentivize advertisers to create less intrusive ads and thus a better web experience, the data could just as easily have been used to create more malicious ads that escape detection.

Not everyone sees Evidon's business model as conflict-free. Jonathan Mayer, a Stanford graduate student and privacy advocate, has said: "Evidon has a financial incentive to encourage the program's adoption and discourage alternatives like Do Not Track and cookie blocking as well as to maintain positive relationships with intrusive advertising companies".

In July 2018, with version 8.2, Ghostery started showing advertisements of its own to users. Burda claims that the advertisements do not send personal data back to their servers and that they do not create a personal profile. This was a program called Ghostery Rewards and has been discontinued.

== See also ==
- Ad blocking
- Disconnect Mobile
- DoNotTrackMe
- List of formerly proprietary software
- NoScript
- Online advertising
- Privacy Badger
- uBlock Origin
