= C Base =

C Base or cbase may refer to:

== Software ==
- C*Base, a bulletin board systems software package for the Commodore 64
- C/Base, a C-language implementation of the numerical analysis library IMSL Numerical Libraries

== Organizations ==
- c-base, a German non-profit based in Berlin for the promotion of computing and electronics skills and knowledge
- College of Business, Arts, Sciences and Education (CBASE), Friends University, Wichita, Kansas, USA

== See also ==
- Base (disambiguation)
- C (disambiguation)
- Sea Base (disambiguation)
