= Privacy Badger =

Browser extension

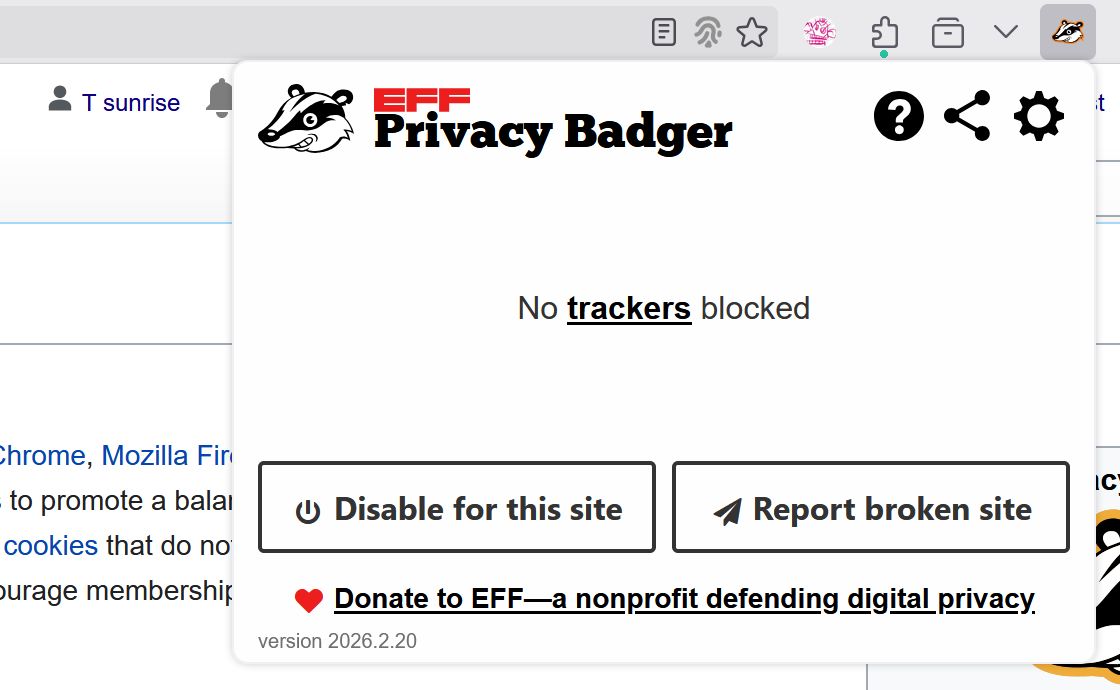
- Privacy Badger extension running on Waterfox
- Developer: Electronic Frontier Foundation
- Release: 1 May 2014; 12 years ago
- Stable release: 2026.9.15 / 15 September 2026; 59 days ago
- Type: Browser extension
- License: GNU GPL v3
- Website: privacybadger.org
- Repository: github.com/EFForg/privacybadger
- As of: January 2020

Privacy Badger is a free and open-source browser extension for Google Chrome, Mozilla Firefox, Edge, Brave, Opera, and Firefox for Android created by the Electronic Frontier Foundation (EFF). Its purpose is to promote a balanced approach to Internet privacy between consumers and content providers by blocking advertisements and tracking cookies that do not respect the Do Not Track setting in a user's web browser. A second purpose, served by free distribution, has been to encourage membership in and donation to the EFF.

== Description ==
The EFF states: "If an advertiser seems to be tracking you across multiple websites without your permission, Privacy Badger automatically blocks that advertiser from loading any more content in your browser. To the advertiser, it's like you suddenly disappeared." Privacy Badger works by detecting the presence of content loaded from third-party domains when you visit a website, then blocking those domains which are determined to be tracking you. Controls on the software allow selective blocking of the third-party domains based on user preference. Unlike adblockers, Privacy Badger only blocks those ads which come with embedded trackers.

Privacy Badger has been noted as one recommended tool in a set of tools to protect online privacy.

In October 2020, following security disclosures by the Google Security Team, Privacy Badger changed its default behavior. While it would previously learn to block new trackers heuristically after installed, it now defaults to blocking only trackers it already knows from automated testing before release. While it can still be configured to learn heuristically, it is no longer the default option because it can be exploited by third-parties to fingerprint the user based on trackers it blocks.

== History ==
The alpha version was released on 1 May 2014, followed by a beta on 21 July 2014. In April 2017, the EFF announced that Privacy Badger had surpassed one million users.

On 19 October 2026, the EFF announced the release of Privacy Badger on the Safari browser for macOS. The extension requires at least Safari version 26.5 or higher.

== Reception ==
Several publications reported on Privacy Badger in May 2014, following its alpha release.

Ian Paul, for PC World, mentions that Privacy Badger "only blocks third-party tracking, not first party", and mentions that prevention of browser fingerprinting is planned for a future release.

Ars Technica notes that if an advertiser makes a commitment to respect Do Not Track requests, their cookies will be unblocked from Privacy Badger.

Nathan Willis, writing for LWN.net, describes the green, yellow, and red sliders of the Privacy Badger menu as being a "nice visualization aid", making it easy for the user to toggle the trackers on and off, if desired – describing it as much easier to browse through than ad blocking add-on interfaces.

Kif Leswing writing for Gigaom writes, "Privacy Badger’s blacklist is generated through heuristic blocking, which means it gets better the longer it is used", and wrote in May 2014 that Privacy Badger "breaks a lot of websites", but considers it important as it is created by a nonprofit organization, and sums it up as "more than good enough".

== Similar blockers ==
Privacy Badger belongs to a class of free tracker blockers which function as web browser plugins. Tracker blockers similar to Privacy Badger include Disconnect, uBlock Origin, Redmorph and Ghostery. Privacy Badger has also been compared favorably to Blur, which has an annual subscription fee.

== See also ==
- AdNauseam – A free and open-source browser extension that blocks and clicks on ads served by sites that ignore Do Not Track
- Blur – An open-source application designed to stop non-consensual third party trackers.
- HTTPS Everywhere – A free and open-source browser extension developed by The Tor Project and the EFF that automatically makes websites use the more secure HTTPS connection.
- Switzerland – An open-source network monitoring utility developed by the EFF to monitor network traffic.
