= Alexia Parks =

Alexia Parks is an American futurist, an expert on gender equality, United Nations Mentor, and founder of 10TRAITS Leadership Institute from Boulder, Colorado.

Parks founded "Votelink.com", the first electronic democracy website in 1995. She was called "one of 50 people who matter most on the Internet" by Newsweek. That same year, Parks was awarded the "BEST Interactive Site of the Year” by Global Network Navigator. Parks official government online hearings were called “apparently the nation's first” by Neal R. Peirce. Lorrie Cranor described Parks work as, “perhaps the best example of such Web-based voting.” Bloomberg News referred to Parks "Laptop Brigade." She serves as a Virtual Mentor with the United Nations Habitat youth mentorship programme.

== Biography ==
Parks was born to John and Janet Delmonte in California. She used the name Alexis Parks in the 1970s, and modified it to "Alexia" in 1994. She received a B.A. in English Literature and completed coursework on a master's degree from the University of Colorado, Boulder.

=== Career ===
Parks has worked as a science journalist, magazine columnist, and served as a special correspondent for the national desk of The Washington Post. She has also served as Director of Communications for a trade association representing 100 major metropolitan daily newspapers. In 2007, the Boulder Daily Camera reported: “For the first time in its history, the United Nations Climate Change Conference will be documented on Internet blogs and the woman who paved the way hails from Boulder.” In opening the door for bloggers, Parks described her role this way: ”The news media is just pulling out the high points, and a blogger can go behind the scenes and look at human interactions. "A blogger is an observer with a voice."

In 2000, she co-founded a national mentor training program to teach parents and teachers about the use of mentoring techniques for "at risk" children.

Parks created "Votelink.com", a website which allows users to vote on major issues of the day.

She founded "Alexia Parks 10Traits Leadership Institute" based on her findings from data and scientific research, including neurobiology, split brain research, hormonal research, the psychology of perception, evolutionary psychology, and both physical and cultural anthropology.

Parks first described the 10 hardwired traits in a 2012 radio interview with Mark Levine. Parks was also selected for an artists and authors series at Chautauqua, and used science-based research to show that "women are natural born leaders." “I wrote a book … based on the new science of a woman's brain. It's based on a lot of science that basically has not been available until now. We were able to pull it together and create this incredibly powerful book -- sometimes people just see the cover and they say, I want to know more about this.”

== Bibliography ==
- Hardwired
- 10 Traits of Women
- Parkinomics
- 8 Great Ways to Thrive in the New Economy
- Rapid Evolution
- An American Gulag
- Focus on Success
- People Heaters
- 10 Golden Rule
- How Love Heals
