= I-pin =

I-pin may refer to:

- Yibin, China, formerly romanized as I-pin
- i-PIN, an internet registration system in South Korea
