= Evidon, Inc. =

- Company type: Private
- Industry: Market intelligence Compliance
- Founded: 2009
- Founders: Scott Meyer (CEO); Colin O'Malley (former CSO); Ed Kozek (CTO)
- Headquarters: New York City, New York, United States
- Website: Official website

Evidon (formerly Ghostery, Inc. and The Better Advertising Project) is a New York City-based company dealing in enterprise marketing analytics and compliance services.

It was previously the owner of the anti-tracking browser extension Ghostery, which it sold to the German, Mozilla-backed company Cliqz GmbH in February 2017.

== History ==
The company was founded in 2009 as The Better Advertising Project by Scott Meyer in the advertising industry. Better Advertising acquired the Ghostery browser extension from David Cancel in January 2009.

In January 2011, the company re-branded as Evidon, a variation of the word "evident". Meyer argued that the previous name had made more sense in the past due to the experimental nature of its product, and that the company needed a more "clear" identity to reflect its professional operation.

In April 2014, Evidon was re-branded as Ghostery, Inc., unifying its branding with the consumer-oriented software. The company planned to increase its focus on enterprise-oriented solutions for digital experience management, managing cloud marketing, and managing privacy compliance.

On February 15, 2017 the Ghostery trademark, service and software was sold to Cliqz International GmbH a wholly owned subsidiary of Munich-based Cliqz GmbH for an undisclosed amount, and the company reverted to Evidon.

On August 2, 2017, Evidon was acquired by K1 Investment Management for a reported $50 million.
