= HTTPS Everywhere =

Browser extension

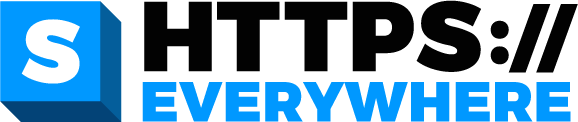
- Developers: Electronic Frontier Foundation and The Tor Project
- Final release: 2022.5.24 / May 25, 2022; 4 years ago
- Written in: JavaScript, Python
- Platform: Firefox for Android; Google Chrome; Mozilla Firefox; Opera; Vivaldi; Microsoft Edge
- Type: Browser extension
- License: GNU GPL v3+ (most code is v2 compatible)
- Website: www.eff.org/https-everywhere
- Repository: github.com/EFForg/https-everywhere
- As of: April 2014

HTTPS Everywhere is a discontinued free and open-source browser extension for Google Chrome, Microsoft Edge, Mozilla Firefox, Opera, Brave, Vivaldi and Firefox for Android, which was developed collaboratively by The Tor Project and the Electronic Frontier Foundation (EFF). It automatically makes websites use a more secure HTTPS connection instead of HTTP, if they support it. The option "Encrypt All Sites Eligible" makes it possible to block and unblock all non-HTTPS browser connections with one click. Due to the widespread adoption of HTTPS on the World Wide Web, and the integration of HTTPS-only mode in major browsers, the extension was retired in January 2023.

== Development ==
HTTPS Everywhere was inspired by Google's increased use of HTTPS and is designed to force the usage of HTTPS automatically whenever possible. The code, in part, is based on NoScript's HTTP Strict Transport Security implementation, but HTTPS Everywhere is intended to be simpler to use than No Script's forced HTTPS functionality which requires the user to manually add websites to a list. The EFF provides information for users on how to add HTTPS rulesets to HTTPS Everywhere, and information on which websites support HTTPS.

=== Platform support ===
A public beta of HTTPS Everywhere for Firefox was released in 2010, and version 1.0 was released in 2011. A beta for Chrome was released in February 2012. In 2014, a version was released for Android phones.

== SSL Observatory ==
The SSL Observatory is a feature in HTTPS Everywhere introduced in version 2.0.1 which analyzes public key certificates to determine if certificate authorities have been compromised, and if the user is vulnerable to man-in-the-middle attacks. In 2013, the ICANN Security and Stability Advisory Committee (SSAC) noted that the data set used by the SSL Observatory often treated intermediate authorities as different entities, thus inflating the number of certificate authorities. The SSAC criticized SSL Observatory for potentially significantly undercounting internal name certificates, and noted that it used a data set from 2010.

== Continual Ruleset Updates ==
The update to Version 2018.4.3, shipped on 3 April 2018, introduces the "Continual Ruleset Updates" function. To apply up-to-date https-rules, this update function executes one rule-matching within 24 hours. A website called https-rulesets was built by the EFF for this purpose. This automated update function can be disabled in the add-on settings. Prior to the update- mechanism there have been ruleset-updates only through app-updates. Even after this feature was implemented there are still bundled rulesets shipped within app-updates.

== Reception ==
Two studies have recommended building HTTPS Everywhere functionality into Android browsers. In 2012, Eric Phetteplace described it as "perhaps the best response to Firesheep-style attacks available for any platform". In 2011, Vincent Toubiana and Vincent Verdot pointed out some drawbacks of the HTTPS Everywhere add-on, including that the list of services which support HTTPS needs maintaining, and that some services are redirected to HTTPS even though they are not yet available in HTTPS, not allowing the user of the extension to get to the service.

== Legacy ==
HTTPS Everywhere initiative inspired opportunistic encryption alternatives:

- 2022: Firefox for Android and Firefox Focus HTTPS-only mode
- 2021: Google Chrome HTTPS-only mode
- 2020: Firefox built-in HTTPS-only mode
- 2019: HTTPZ for Firefox / WebExt supporting browsers
- 2017: Smart-HTTPS (closed-source early since v0.2)

== See also ==
- Transport Layer Security (TLS) – Cryptographic protocols that provide communications security over a computer network.
- Privacy Badger – A free browser extension created by the EFF that blocks advertisements and tracking cookies.
- Switzerland (software) – An open-source network monitoring utility developed by the EFF to monitor network traffic.
- Let's Encrypt – A free automated X.509 certificate authority designed to simplify the setup and maintenance of TLS encrypted secure websites.
- HTTP Strict Transport Security – A web security policy mechanism which helps to protect websites against protocol downgrade attacks and cookie hijacking.
