= European Association of Communication Agencies =

European trade association for communication agencies

- Abbreviation: EACA
- Formation: 1959; 67 years ago in Oslo
- Type: Nonprofit
- Legal status: Trade association
- Purpose: Advocate for communication agencies
- Location: Brussels, Belgium
- Region served: Europe
- Official language: English
- Affiliations: European Advertising Standards Alliance
- Funding: Member fees
- Website: eaca.eu

The European Association of Communications Agencies (EACA) is a European trade association founded in 1959. Based in Brussels, Belgium, it brings together more than 2,500 communications agencies and agency associations from nearly 30 European countries. EACA members include advertising, media, digital, branding and PR agencies.

EACA represents its members and defends their interests in the decision-making processes of the Institutions of the European Union. Privacy and data protection, gender portrayal, disinformation, digital taxation and regulation of online platforms are some of the issues that it addresses. The association is also home to “Inspire”, a single European hub with education and training opportunities for all stakeholders in the communications industry, and it runs two advertising awards annually.

EACA is financed by its members and is a member of the European Advertising Standards Alliance, which is the single authoritative voice on advertising self-regulation issues in Europe and the founding member of the European Interactive Digital Advertising Alliance which provides the AdChoices icon to companies involved in data-driven advertising across Europe.

== History ==
EACA was founded in 1959 in Oslo by a group of full-service agencies from the Nordic countries, France, Britain and the Federal Republic of Germany. In the second half of the 1970s it moved its activity to Brussels to be closer to European policy-makers.

== Activities ==
- Promoting and protecting the interests of Europe's communications agencies through lobbying activities
- Providing information to agencies, members, policy stakeholders and anyone interested in the industry
- Partnering with other industry bodies to tackle some of the key industry issues which influence agency business at a large scale
- Providing education and training opportunities for all stakeholders in the communications industry
- Running two advertising awards annually: the Effie Awards Europe for effectiveness and the IMC European Awards for brand activation

== Membership structure ==
The membership structure is divided into five councils:

- The International Agencies' Council (IAC) - the largest international agencies in Europe
- The National Associations' Council (NAC) - the national agency associations in 29 European markets
- The Media Agencies' Council (MAC) - international media networks
- The Integrated Marketing Communications' Council (IMCC) - national associations of leading sales promotion agencies in Europe
- The Health Communications' Council (HCC) - the key players in European health communications
