= Web ranking =

Web ranking may refer to:

- Alexa web ranking system
- Compete.com, web ranking analysis based on United States traffic
- Google PageRank, link analysis algorithm
- Webometrics Ranking of World Universities, Ranking Web of World Universities
