= The Digital Standard =

Software testing norms and guide

- Mission statement: "to help guide the future design of consumer software, digital platforms and services, and Internet-connected products"
- Commercial?: no
- Established: 6 March 2017
- Website: github.com/consumer-reports-innovation-lab/TheDigitalStandard

The Digital Standard is a technical standard which offers product testing criteria for software and Smart devices. Consumers or manufacturers can use the standards to evaluate the extent to which a product protects various digital rights including consumer privacy, information security, freedom of speech, and product ownership. A consortium of organizations including Consumer Reports, Disconnect Mobile, Ranking Digital Rights, The Cyber Independent Testing Lab, and Aspiration presented the standard in March 2017.

== Using the standard ==
The intended use for the standard is to encourage any consumer or manufacturer to evaluate and discuss the impact which any product's digital features have on individuals and society. Since the standard is a list of questions, anyone can answer the questions for any product to generate an evaluation. Supporters of the standard argue that the answers to the questions should either be obvious or the manufacturers should voluntarily disclose the answers. Goals of the standard include setting consumer expectations for how products should protect them, communicating acceptable practices to manufacturers, and encouraging conversations about what sorts of product behavior are either beneficial or harmful to the consumers who use them.

== Evaluation criteria ==
The digital standard makes 4 assertions about digital rights:

1. manufacturers should provide information security with their products
2. manufacturers should provide Internet privacy with their products
3. manufacturers should design products for consumer ownership
4. manufacturers should be ethical and accountable for whatever impact their products have

From the foundation of these assertions, the digital standard claims that good products will have the following characteristics:

- user can see and know whatever data the product collects
- users can export any data they have contributed
- user owns the product
- user information secure from intrusion and hacking
- product default is for maximum privacy
- user can delete account and all submitted content
- product is safe from software vulnerability
- company discloses how they use user's data
- anyone can examine the product's software
- the product will continue to work after the manufacture ceases supporting it

== Public participation ==
The standard is a work in progress which is actively seeking comments and participation from anyone who cares about digital rights.

== Responses ==
At the time of the standard's release the organizations which established it made their own statements about their contributions and how they are partnering with others.

A representative of the Consumer Technology Association expressed a wish that the anyone using the standard to evaluate a product should describe how they calculated a score and the limitations on what a score communicates.

Peiter Zatko of The Cyber Independent Testing Lab said, "We need to shed light that this industry really hasn't been caring about the build quality and software safety.

Craig Newmark, speaking both as a board member of Consumer Reports and an advocate for digital rights, commented that the standard was "urgently needed."
