= Switzerland (software) =

- Developer: Electronic Frontier Foundation
- Preview release: 0.1.0 / 2009-05-05
- Operating system: Windows, macOS, Linux
- License: GNU General Public License
- Website: eff.org/testyourisp/switzerland
- Repository: Switzerland on SourceForge

Switzerland (named after the European country of the same name) is an open-source network monitoring utility developed and released by the Electronic Frontier Foundation (EFF). Its goal is to monitor network traffic between two systems running the program to see if the user's Internet service provider is violating network neutrality, like Comcast did in 2007 with the BitTorrent protocol. Switzerland is no longer being actively developed.

== See also ==
- HTTPS Everywhere – also made by the EFF
- Privacy Badger – also made by the EFF
