= David Cancel =

- Born: The Bronx, New York, U.S.
- Education: Queens College
- Occupations: Entrepreneur, Investor, Author
- Employer: Drift
- Known for: Founding Bolt, Compete.com, Ghostery and Drift
- Website: davidcancel.com

David Cancel is an American entrepreneur, investor, and founder of several software companies. He is the CEO and founder of Drift, a Cambridge, Massachusetts-based company which creates messaging software for businesses.

== Education ==
Cancel attended Queens College and dropped out before attaining a bachelor's degree in Computer Science and Accounting.

== Career ==
Cancel was Chief Product Officer at Internet marketing company HubSpot from 2011 and 2014. He joined HubSpot after the acquisition of his previous company Performable for $20 million.

While at HubSpot, Cancel hired most of the HubSpot engineering team, growing it from 20 to 100 engineers. HubSpot CEO and co-founder Brian Halligan described Cancel as a “visionary product development leader” and at the time of the Performable acquisition, claimed to have the "best product development team in B2B software.”

Prior to Performable, Cancel was the co-founder and CTO of Lookery, the founder and CTO of Compete.com, which was acquired by WPP for $150 million, and the CTO of BuyerZone, which was acquired by Reed Elsevier.

Cancel is also the founder of Ghostery, a global marketing technology company that provides online transparency and control to individuals and businesses. Ghostery has been used by over 40 million consumers to control how they are tracked online, and Ghostery also provides privacy governance services, powering compliance for more than $2 billion of advertising and e-commerce transactions annually.

In 2014, Cancel left HubSpot to start Drift and raised a $15 million Series A from venture capital firms Charles River Ventures, General Catalyst, NextView Ventures, Founder Collective, and angel investors including Brian Shin, Brian Halligan, Dharmesh Shah, and others.

In 2016, Cancel named one of Boston Tech 30 by Boston Magazine. In 2017, Harvard Business School named Cancel an Entrepreneur in Residence at the School’s Arthur Rock Center for Entrepreneurship.
