= South Korean identity card =

National identity card of South Korea

- Hangul: 주민등록증
- Hanja: 住民登錄證
- RR: jumin deungnokjeung
- MR: chumin tŭngnokchŭng

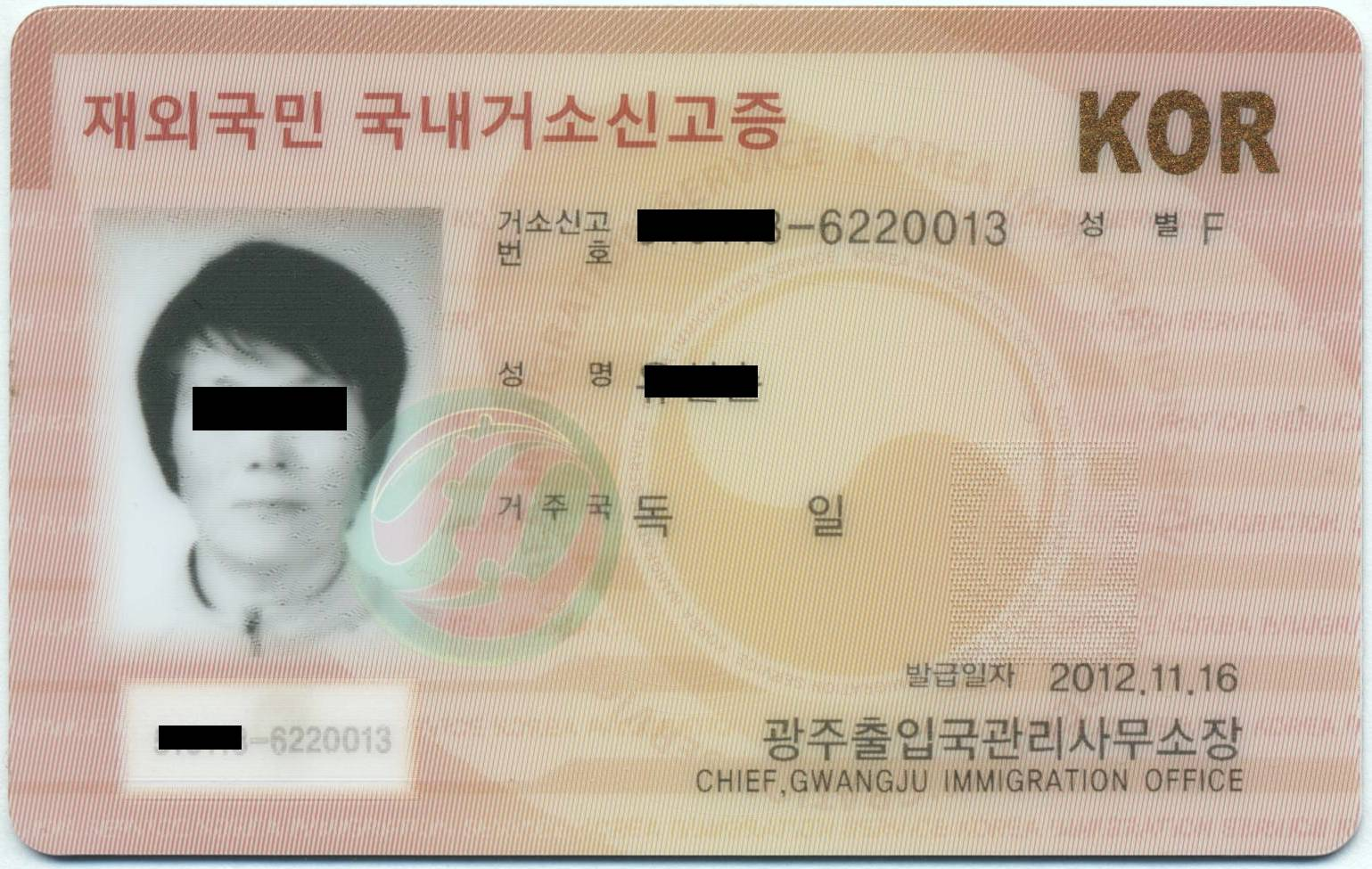
Korean ID Card for overseas Koreans

Korean citizens are issued a national ID card (Korean: 주민등록증) when they reach the age of 18. This card contains a unique resident registration number (주민등록번호). The first six numbers indicate the citizen's date of birth, in the format YYMMDD, for example, someone born on 1980 August 15 would have 800815 as the first six digits. The last seven numbers includes information such as where the birth was registered. This resident registration number is used by Korean citizens and foreign nationals for all forms of record-keeping.

== History ==
=== Identity cards in the history of Korea ===
In Korea, the first identity card appeared in the Joseon Dynasty, it was called Hopaebeop (호패법). The Joseon Dynasty, which had a centralized national government, it was necessary to have an ID card for all people to effectively maintain the class system, after that the Korean Empire, which succeeded the Joseon Dynasty, made the first modern ID cards. Since then, the current identity card system began in the postwar period, following World War II and Korea's independence from the Japanese Empire.

=== Citizenship certificate, the forerunner of the identity card ===
With the outbreak of the Korean war, there was a need to distinguish between legal residents and enemy spies. Thus the first Residents ID card was issued in 1950. On that card, detailed personal information such as address, and occupation, as well as body mass, blood type, etc. were written to fit the special circumstances of wartime.

=== The first modern ID card ===
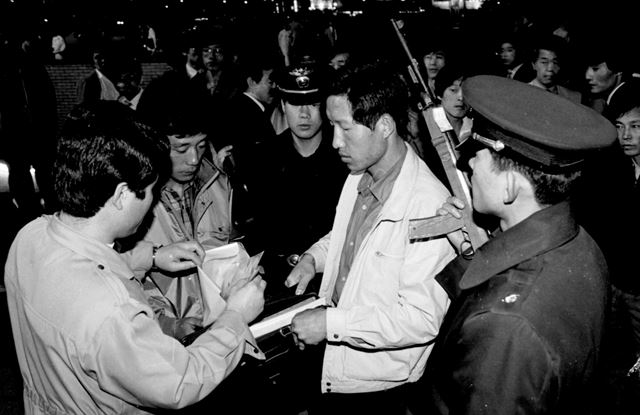
The implementation of social security was emblematic case showing that South Korea holds a total surveillance society. Past ID card checkpoints scene. Korea Times material photo.

Resident registration numbers have their origins in the social security legislation in 1962. At that time its dual enrollment to citizens and residents was available so it was not performed properly. Then in 1968, after the ‘Kim Shin -jo incident’, when North Korean special forces stormed The Blue House, it amended the Social Security Act because Spy identifies were given a number to each citizen.

A resident registration number at the time consisted of 12 digits. In November 21, it was issued by former President Park Chung-hee identity card No. 1 to No. 110101-100001, and Yuk Young-soo was issued a second call with number 110101-200002. At this time the front row was made with a number of regional issues, the back had been issued Order.

=== The beginning of the current 13-digit resident registration number ===
It is a 13-digit number such as this was written in 1975. Front row was the combination of date of birth, gender and birth backseat area, being slightly more private than before. At this time there began to arise regulations that must be presented if the police officer asked.

== Configuration ==
=== Overall components ===
In current Resident Registration Act, ID card must be mounted name, ID photo, fingerprint, published date and resident registration agency. But if the resident wants applicating blood type, it can be applicated on the basis of Presidential Decree. (2 of Art. 14 of the Residents Registration Law)

=== Holographic anti-forgery ===
There is a Taegeuk(태극) shape on the left, and an image of a globe showing the Pacific Rim in the bottom center. The phrase "대한민국" (Republic of Korea) is written in a crescent shape.

== Status of ID card issued ==
=== Issuance ===
In Resident Registration Act, mayor, Supervisor, Alderman shall issue to 17-ages-old who jurisdictions residents. The person who aged 17-years-old must proposes of ID card issued to Act, mayor, Supervisor. (3 of Art. 24 of the Residents Registration Law) The ID card is issued by computerized resident information center of the Ministry of Public Administration and Security, at the request of the Mayor, Supervisor, Alderman, and it has been grant and delivered to City. (1 of Art. 28 of the Residents Registration Law) If it lost or damaged, the name or date of birth or gender changed, insufficient of ID card entry column, difficult of identification by changed the face or etc., that time replacement of ID card. (3 of Art. 40 of the Residents Registration Law) In this time, People who have an identity card is 40 million people, and it is estimated that about 350 million per year issuance.

=== Usage ===
ID card is estimated that is used more than hundreds of thousands of cases a day. Usually more than 60% get the description from the financial institutions are using this ID card, and it is also used on ARS or Online Applications amounts to about 10 million per day.

== Criticism and controversy ==
When issuing a South Korean national ID card, the government registers the fingerprints of ten fingers, and a fingerprint is printed on the back of the issued national ID card. However, criticism has been raised about printing fingerprints on national ID cards, saying there is a high possibility of fingerprint leakage.

The United Nations recommended that South Korea "reexamine the resident registration system to protect the right to privacy and strictly limit the use of resident registration numbers unless necessary, such as providing public services" in 2008. Actually, most developed countries, such as the United States and Japan, don't print fingerprints on ID cards for their citizens unlike South Korea.

Meanwhile, the Constitutional Court of Korea ruled that this resident registration system is constitutional in 2024.

== See also ==
- Resident registration number
