= Advertising industry =

Economic branch

The advertising industry is the global industry of public relations and marketing companies, media services, and advertising agencies. Several large advertising agencies, including WPP plc, Omnicom, Publicis Groupe, Interpublic and Dentsu, are among the industry's largest. It is a global, multibillion-dollar business that connects manufacturers and consumers. The industry ranges from nonprofit organizations to Fortune 500 companies. The advertising industry has the capacity to provide valuable insights into the audience’s behavior and generate data that enables the business to deeply understand their target audiences. The analytical tools were developed to facilitate the evaluation, as the advertising sector expanded. This advancement assists the business to create a better product and measure their growth investment.

In the United States, there are more than 65,000 advertising agencies employing nearly 250,000 employees with annual revenues of $166.8 billion, as of 2014. In 2016, global advertising sales reached $493 billion. In 2017, it was estimated that digital ad sales were first to surpass the TV market.

== Trade associations ==
Trade associations representing parts or all of the advertising industry include:

- Advertising Association, a London-based trade association representing United Kingdom-based advertising agencies
- American Advertising Federation, a Washington, D.C.-based trade association representing U.S.-based agencies
- Association of National Advertisers, a New York City-based association representing U.S. marketing agencies and companies
- International Advertising Association (IAA)

== Programs ==
- AdChoices
- Google Ads
- Microsoft Advertising
