= .brave =

Internet top-level domain

- Introduced: May 20, 2025
- Status: Active
- Registry: Unstoppable Domains
- Registry website: buy.unstoppabledomains.com/brave

.brave is a special-use non-ICANN internet domain invented by Brave Software, Inc. and Unstoppable Domains.

As of 2026, this domain is not recognized by ICANN and therefore can not be resolved by most browsers. Only Brave browser supports it natively. Users of other browsers can install a browser extension for this functionality. In 2026, Brave Software, Inc. and Unstoppable Domains announced intent to file a joint proposal with ICANN 2026 round of gTLD program to make .brave an official (brand) gTLD. If ICANN accepts the proposal later in 2027, this domain will be accessible to all internet users.

Brave Software, Inc. and Unstoppable Domains promote .brave as a blockchain-based top-level domain (TLD) for individualism, send cryptocurrency, and decentralized websites.

== History ==
The TLD was launched in May 2025 by Brave with Unstoppable Domains as a way to enable individualism, send cryptocurrency (including Sonic, Solana, Ethereum, Base, Bitcoin, and others through Polygon), and navigate Web3. It was offered to the users of Brave which included the ability to host decentralized websites on the InterPlanetary File System (IPFS) using these domains though these domains are unable to resolve on other browsers due to operations outside the ICANN-regulated DNS system. According to talks between Brave and Unstoppable Domains, they plan on registering .brave as an official gTLD with ICANN by 2026. The goal is for the domain to be compatible with both Web3 applications and conventional Web2 browsers.

In May of 2025, Brave became the first browser to launch on-chain naming service, allowing access to the .brave domain for all Brave subscribers. Brave also integrated itself further into Unstoppables economy, allowing for higher security and more access for its users. In turn, Unstoppable is joining Brave's Rewards 3.0 Partner Program. With this new system, Brave users can post censorship-resistant websites on IFPS, allowing them to directly connect with Brave's browser and bypass normal fees.

All .brave domains are minted as NFTs.

== See also ==
- Brave (web browser) – Chromium-based open-source web browser
