= Digital Advertising Alliance of Canada =

Canadian non-profit trade group

Digital Advertising Alliance of Canada (DAAC)
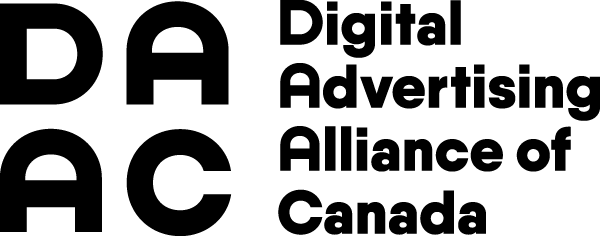
- Digital Advertising Alliance of Canada (DAAC)
- Formation: 2013
- Type: Trade Association
- Legal status: Non-Profit
- Headquarters: Toronto, Ontario
- Region served: Canada
- Members: 70+
- Official language: English, French

The Digital Advertising Alliance of Canada (DAAC) is a Canadian non-profit trade association.

Founded in 2013 by eight Canadian marketing and communication trade associations, the DAAC is responsible for the operations of the AdChoices self-regulatory programs, and the Political Ads Program, in Canada.

== The AdChoices program in Canada ==
The AdChoices program provides Canadian consumers with the ability to opt out of interest-based advertising from participating companies through the DAAC website.

The following association developed this program:

- Association des agences de communication créative (A2C);
- Association of Canadian Advertisers (ACA);
- Canadian Marketing Association (CMA);
- Canadian Media Directors' Council (CMDC);
- Le Conseil des directeurs médias du Québec (CDMQ);
- Institute of Communication Agencies (ICA); and,
- Interactive Advertising Bureau of Canada (IAB Canada).

Advertising Standards Canada (ASC) leveraged accountability by monitoring participants and providing guidance to aid companies to comply with the principles. ASC also compiles reports about the AdChoices program in Canada.

== Political Ads Program ==
In June 2019, the DAAC announced the Political Ads Program in Canada, an ad transparency platform for political advertisers.

== OPC Research Study on OBA ==
In June 2015, the Office of the Privacy Commissioner of Canada released a research study of the Canadian digital ad industry, to see how their guidelines for online behavioural advertising were being adhered to. The OPC study found that notice of OBA and opt-out was given to web users 96% of the time – primarily by way of the AdChoices icon, but they did recommend some improvements, such as ensuring all targeted ads have notice on them and the ability to opt out, companies avoid targeting based on sensitive topics, and closely monitor their use of retargeting.
