= IronVest =

Browser extension fraud prevention company

IronVest (formerly Abine Blur and DoNotTrackMe) is a browser extension biometric fraud prevention company that develops and markets fraud prevention products for consumers and businesses, founded in 2022. The IronVest consumer security and privacy app and browser extension evolved from Blur, a privacy product designed to block trackers and provide masking tools, developed by Abine, a privacy company headquartered in Boston, Massachusetts, and first released for Firefox in March 2011. There is a free version, and a paid one with more features.

DoNotTrackMe (DNTMe) blocked Internet tracking activity, which Abine defined as "a request that a webpage tries to make your browser perform that will share information intended to record, profile, or share your online activity". DNTMe was available for Mozilla Firefox, Google Chrome, Safari, and Internet Explorer browsers. In July 2012, the company claimed 1,500,000 downloads. In October 2013, Abine reported that they could not develop DNTMe for smartphones and tablets due to technical limitations but were working on other mobile products.

An associated add-on, MaskMe, provided users with masked email addresses without charge, and masked telephone numbers and disposable virtual credit cards for a subscription charge. A masked email address can be given by a user to an organization so that they can address email to it which is redirected to the user's real address—never provided to the sender. Masked telephone numbers work similarly. Virtual credit cards are used once, online only, then deleted, so that the card details cannot be used for later fraud. IronVest continues to deliver these products with added security and functionality, such as biometric account access and two-factor authentication (2FA) and text messaging (also known as small-messaging service or SMS) protection.

In November 2014, Abine announced Blur as a replacement for their DoNotTrackMe and MaskMe services, with both free and paid options.

Blur later became IronVest (established in 2022), which developed the service further into a security and privacy consumer service. IronVest was rated "outstanding" by PCMag.

IronVest released on 26 September 2023 the first version of a biometric fraud prevention technology delivered to financial institutions via a software development kit (SDK) that claims to eliminate all forms of account takeover or authorized fraud by allowing only authorized users to take actions.

== See also ==
- DeleteMe, another service by Abine
- uBlock Origin – an ad-blocker
- Disconnect Mobile – An open source application to stop third-party trackers.
- Ghostery – A privacy and security-related browser extension.
- Privacy Badger – An ad- and cookie-blocker browser extension.
