= Compete.com =

Defunct American website

- Company type: Subsidiary
- Website type: Web traffic and ranking
- Available in: English
- Founded: 2000; 26 years ago
- Headquarters: Boston, Massachusetts, United States
- Area served: U.S. Internet Users
- Owner: TNS (WPP)
- Founders: Bill Gross, Lars Perkins, David Cancel
- Industry: Online Competitive Intelligence (Web Analytics/Market Research)
- Products: Compete Site Analytics (free), Compete PRO Intro, Compete PRO Standard, Compete PRO Advanced
- Services: Site Profile, Search Analytics, Incoming and Outgoing Traffic, Ranked Lists, Category Profile, Compete Blog
- Website: www.compete.com
- Current status: Site shut down

Compete.com was a web traffic analysis service. The company was founded in 2000, and ceased operations in December 2016.

== Services ==
Compete.com provided two categories of information:

- Site Analytics, a free service, where the user can enter any domain name and receive unique visitors and Compete Rank for the entered site.
- Search Analytics, a paid service that shows the user which keywords are sending traffic to the user's website and its competitors.

Compete's panel measures U.S., but not international users. Compete has worked diligently to develop what it believes is the largest and most diverse panel of online consumers in the United States.

== Compete Toolbar ==
The Compete Toolbar allowed users to view the Compete Trust Scores and the US Internet ranks of websites they visit. This was done by sending the URLs that users visit to Compete.com. Compete.com then sent back the trust scores and internet ranks from its database to the users.

Additionally, users of the Compete Toolbar had the option of participating in Community Share. By participating in Community Share, users were assigned a user number, and that number will be submitted along with the URLs of the websites that these users visit. This information was used to roughly determine how many users visit each website.

Although no personally identifiable information was submitted to Compete.com, the server received the originating IP address.

== History ==
Compete.com was launched in 2000 by Bill Gross, an entrepreneur who started the search engine GoTo.com (later Overture). In March 2008, London market research company TNS purchased Compete.com for $150 million. The Compete.com service ceased activity on December 31, 2016.

== See also ==
- Alexa.com
- Quantcast.com
