= Sea Base (disambiguation) =

Sea Base, formerly known as Florida National High Adventure Sea Base, is a high adventure program base run by Scouting America in the Florida Keys.

Sea Base may also refer to:

- Long Beach Sea Base
- Newport Sea Base
- Pardee Scout Sea Base

== See also ==
- Offshore platform
- Mobile offshore base
- Underwater habitat
- Sea bass, common name for a variety of species of marine fish
- C Base (disambiguation)
- Base (disambiguation)
- Sea (disambiguation)
