= Resident registration number =

South Korean national identification number

- Hangul: 주민등록번호
- Hanja: 住民登錄番號
- RR: jumin deungnok beonho
- MR: chumin tŭngnok pŏnho

In South Korea, a resident registration number (RRN; Korean: 주민등록번호) is a 13-digit number issued to all residents of South Korea regardless of nationality. Similar to national identification numbers in other countries, it is used to identify people in various private transactions such as banking and employment. It was also used extensively for online identification purposes, but after 2013 resident registration number cannot be used for identification unless other laws require processing resident registration numbers. Foreign nationals receive a foreign resident number (외국인등록번호) upon registration with the local immigration office.

Every South Korean citizen within a month of their 17th birthday registers their fingerprint at the government local office and is issued the Resident Registration Card (주민등록증) that contains their name, registration number, home address, fingerprint, and photograph.

== Components ==
The resident registration number consists of 13 digits, with each digit providing specific information, as illustrated below:

yymmdd-sbbbbnc(before Oct. 2020)
yymmdd-s******(after Oct. 2020)

- The first six digits signify the person's date of birth; for example, a person born on September 1, 1946, such as former president Roh Moo-hyun, would have 460901 as the first six digits of his RRN.
- S, the seventh digit, indicates the sex and the century in which the person was born:
  - 9: Males born 1800-1899
  - 0: Females born 1800-1899
  - 1: Males born 1900-1999
  - 2: Females born 1900-1999
  - 3: Males born 2000-present
  - 4: Females born 2000-present
  - 5: Foreign males born 1900-1999
  - 6: Foreign females born 1900-1999
  - 7: Foreign males born 2000-present
  - 8: Foreign females born 2000-present
- bbbb, the eighth through eleventh digits, signifies place of birth on Korean citizens' cards. In the registration numbers of foreign residents, these number indicate which agency issued the registration number. The first two b digits refer to the regional government in which the birth was registered. The final two b digits refer to the town or district's community center in which the birth was registered. Each center has a unique number assigned to it by the Ministry of the Interior and Safety. The first two b digits are as follows:
  - Seoul - 00-08
  - Busan - 09-12
  - Incheon - 13-15
  - Gyeonggi Province - 16-25
  - Gangwon Province - 26-34
  - North Chungcheong Province - 35-39
  - Daejeon - 40
  - South Chungcheong Province - 41-47
  - Sejong City - 44, 96
  - North Jeolla Province - 48-54
  - South Jeolla Province - 55-66
  - Gwangju - 55, 56
  - Daegu - 67-69, 76
  - North Gyeongsang Province - 70-75, 77-81
  - South Gyeongsang Province - 82-84, 86-89, 90-92
  - Ulsan - 85, 90
  - Jeju Province - 93-95
- n, the 12th digit, is a sequential number used to differentiate those of the same sex born on the same day in the same location.
- c, the 13th digit, is a check digit, used to verify that the number has been transcribed correctly. It is generated from the rest of the digits using the following algorithm (digits lettered a through m in order):
  - m = [11 − {(2a + 3b + 4c + 5d + 6e + 7f + 8g + 9h + 2i + 3j + 4k + 5l) mod 11}] mod 10
- After October 2020, b, n, c are random numbers

== Overseas permanent resident problem ==
Every citizen of South Korea automatically receives a resident registration number with seventh digit of 9, 0, 1, 2, 3, or 4 (indicating as a Korean citizen) when one's parents register one's birth in South Korea. Therefore, foreign born citizens of South Korea do not automatically receive a resident registration number even after they obtain their Korean passports through Korean diplomatic offices. Foreign born citizens can have resident registration numbers with seventh digit of 9, 0, 1, 2, 3, or 4 by visiting South Korea and registering their births, but the South Korean Immigration Bureau considered foreign born citizens with overseas permanent resident status as foreigners and did not issue a resident registration number with seventh digit of 9, 0, 1, 2, 3, or 4 to foreign born citizens with overseas permanent resident status. Since a resident registration number with seventh digit of 9, 0, 1, 2, 3, or 4 is required to exercise rights of citizenship, citizens without a resident registration number were not guaranteed rights of citizenship except diplomatic protection.

As of 2016, holders of South Korean passports with overseas residency are now eligible for a resident registration number with seventh digit of 9, 0, 1, 2, 3, or 4 regardless of their permanent resident status. They are exempted from taxation and conscription in South Korea, but they can exercise their rights of citizenship such as voting. They still have to apply for a RRN in South Korea.

== Foreign Residents ==
All foreigner nationals (except those affiliated with the U.S. military) receive a foreign resident number (외국인등록번호) when registering at their local immigration office. Registration is mandatory if they are residing in the Republic of Korea for more than 90 days. The Foreign Registration Number on the Residence Card (외국인등록증) serves as a substitute for the "resident" (or national) registration number on a Korean citizen's Resident Registration Card (주민등록증).

Without this number, foreign nationals are unable to register for a driving license, register on some websites, use SMS verification, utilize internet banking, and more. This makes the number essential for daily activities and ease living in South Korea. Many are unaware of how many services depend on the use of the residence number through SMS verification (or i-PIN).

== Online use ==
Many South Korean websites require users to submit a valid resident registration number to create an account. This practice ties each registered account to a unique online identity, rather than allowing anonymous registration. Since only a few large websites allow alternate means of identification (such as a passport number), foreigners are unable to use some of South Korea's websites.

The principal means of validating a resident registration number is to use an algorithm to check the last digit against what it should be based upon the rest of the digits entered (i.e. checksum verification) however this only ensures it is a valid number but does not authenticate the user.

On 26 July 2011, a hacking incident of SK Communications (owner of NateOn, South Korea's most popular messenger) took place, during which about 70% of all Korean citizens' numbers were hacked. As a result, all South Korean websites were obliged to delete and are no longer allowed to use the number except for payments. The RRN has since replaced the number with identification SMS (via phone owners' information), public key certificate (requiring a visit to a bank, since PKC is stored in user's PC or personal device unlike other countries), and i-PIN, Internet Personal Identification Number, which may be obtained via registration of RRN with a governmental site.

== Fraud ==
Since many South Korean websites require a valid resident registration number (RRN) in order to create an account, this presents many opportunities for identity theft and other types of fraud. For example, it was found that former South Korean president Roh Moo-hyun's resident registration number was used to gain access to hundreds of pornographic websites, as well as entertainment and gaming websites.

Identity theft and other fraud is difficult to defeat in Korea, because each person's RRN is unchangeable, unlike other nation's identification numbers which can be changed if they are compromised (such as the United States' SSN). Complaints about identity theft led the South Korean government to implement stiff penalties for using someone else's resident registration number. Offenders may serve three years in jail or pay a ₩10,000,000 fine.

== See also ==
- South Korean identity card
