= Cloud marketing =

Digital marketing technique with a focus on digital integration and centralization

Cloud marketing is the process of an organization's efforts to market their goods and services online through integrated digital experiences, by which they are specialized for every end-user. It aims to use advertising methods to give tailor-made adverts to customers based on their browsing history or interests via online applications through social media websites such as Facebook, Twitter and various online portals. Cloud marketing platforms could be supported by third-party providers that maintain the platform.

Cloud marketing requires efforts in data privacy and data protection, especially for EU markets where GDPR (General Data Protection Regulation) has changed the regulatory landscape.

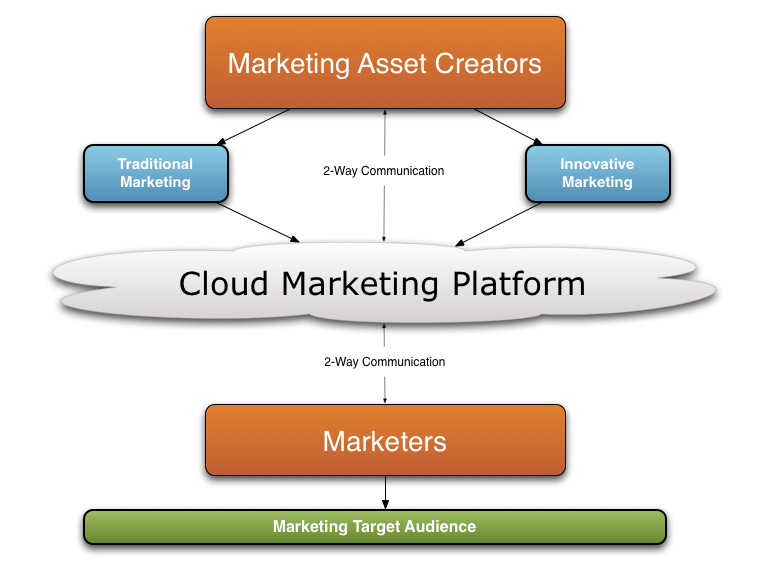
Image above displays the Cloud Marketing Model, alongside the work flow diagram of the platform.

== Advantages of Cloud Marketing ==
=== Cost-effectiveness ===
Cloud marketing enables businesses to reduce the cost of print distribution materials such as newspapers, circulars, direct mail, catalogs, and magazines and instead send strategic promotional content to consumers through digital formats. This allows businesses to send content digitally, which is a faster and cheaper approach to engaging with customers. This reduces the printing costs and increases efficiency.

=== Personalization ===
Personalization allows businesses to creatively use interactive means to develop a relevant and effective advertising approach when targeting a consumer. Customization includes social media sites such as Facebook to customize pages and send them to friends or the public over the internet. Marketers can combine data through third-party data sources, including email and surveys, to visualize the consumer's experience.

=== Time ===
Time is vital for targeting customers. Advertising using traditional methods, such as posters and surveys, has limited time before they often become invalid. Cloud marketing enables businesses to produce advertising when required. The material can easily be removed and if the campaign or season is over, the material can be erased from the internet or adapted to enhance material to the end user, linking with the customization element to ensure the marketing material is fit for its purpose, and delivered at the correct time.

== Disadvantages of Cloud Marketing ==
=== User experience ===
When a company markets its products and services to a consumer, the consumer is not able to physically touch or manage the product or service. This experience could potentially lay off customers who have been targeted if the business's efforts have not satisfied the consumer's decision to buy the merchandise. The material content would vary on the device, as compatibility and operating systems will affect the material content being delivered.

=== Fraudulent material ===
Internet fraud has grown rapidly globally, faster than the Internet. More and more fraudulent criminals can send promotional pop-ups in the form of online advertising on the World Wide Web to attract web traffic and display promotional content. The malware attacks can lay off customers responding to marketing material posted to their devices. Labour MP Chris Evans said: “Copycat websites are part of a growing industry which exists purely to trick the public out of their hard-earned money.”

=== Digital divide ===
Digital divide is the partition between a given population within their use of information technology. This can be due to factors including:

- Geographic
- Cultural
- Economic growth
- Democracy
- Disabilities

This limits businesses' performance in marketing their goods and services globally to new locations if there is limited access to information technology in certain locations. The segment of consumers would be unable to experience and view online marketing methods from a business or resources, resulting in adopting a traditional method of leaflets and billboards known as direct marketing.

== Cloud Marketing strategy ==
Strategy is the direction of action that aims to achieve a specific predetermined goal or objective. One of the common ways to approach formulating a company's cloud marketing strategy is by separating the activities into the following stages.

=== Setting the objectives ===
The first step is defining the objectives (or goals) the company has for the marketing project. To set the objectives, a set of metrics (also referred to as "measures of success") are introduced, represented by either quantitative or qualitative data. By establishing the goal before defining other components of the strategy, a common decision-making framework is introduced, allowing for a more data-driven approach to evaluating various competing options. This also helps eliminate certain biases and acts as a basis for post-implementation evaluation (described below).

=== Development ===
The development stage is where the marketing team creates the graphics and media material. The web development team found a method to post the material onto the World Wide Web or online source. The marketing ad would need to meet its main objective and purpose, the development team will need to develop and plan to make the material visually appealing.

=== Maintenance ===
The maintenance step will require updating whilst the material is online which requires continuous upkeep. Cloud marketing techniques include regular updating to ensure they are reaching their end-user and have a valid subject. Marketing members are responsible for moderating any discussion boards and keeping content updated increasing the validity.

=== Evaluation ===
Throughout the marketing material, the message would need to be evaluated to determine how successful it has been to the end-user. The outcome should be established in the strategy, allowing the marketer to adapt and increase the overall efficiency of the cloud marketing method.

== See also ==
- Adobe Marketing Cloud
- Cloud computing
- Direct marketing
