= I-PIN =

Online identity verification service in South Korea

i-PIN (Internet Personal Identification Number; Korean: 아이핀) is a "commercial" alternative to the Resident Registration Number used in South Korea for on-line identification. Because of the increasing usage of Resident Registration Number for on-line services make it open for the rampant identity frauds and inefficiencies, it is a comprehensive new way for South Korean internet users to engage the web.

In July 2005, the guideline for i-PIN was established; in October 2006, i-PIN was put into trial; on July 2, 2009, it changed its official name to "i-PIN 2.0".

== Registration ==
There are mix of private companies and governmental associations that can let South Koreans to register for i-PIN accounts:

- Siren 24 i-PIN (사이렌24아이핀) by Seoul Credit Rating & Information Inc.
- KCB i-PIN (KCB아이핀) by the Korea Credit Bureau Inc.
- Nice i-PIN (나이스아이핀) by Information & Credit Evaluation Inc.
- Governmental i-PIN (공공 아이핀) by the Ministry of Public Administration and Security Governmental i-PIN Center
