= Cliqz =

Web browser developed by Cliqz GmbH

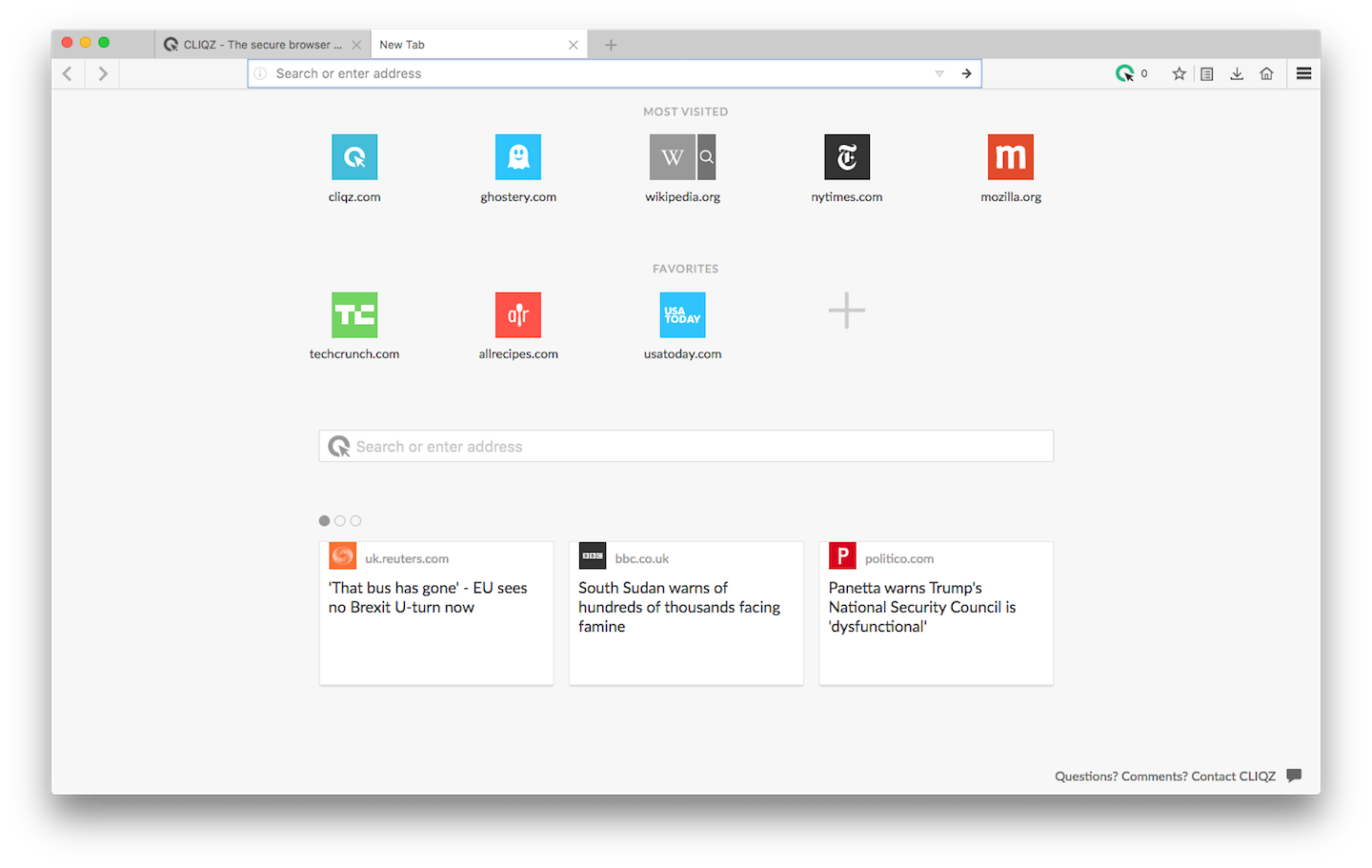
- Cliqz browser start page
- Developer: Cliqz GmbH
- Release: 2015; 11 years ago

Final release(s)
- Android: 1.10.1 / 14 June 2021
- iOS: 3.7.2 / 10 June 2021
- macOS: 1.38.0 / 22 July 2020
- Windows: 1.38.0 / 22 July 2020
- Written in: C, C++, JavaScript, XML User Interface Language, XML Binding Language, Rust
- Operating system: Windows 7 or later, macOS, Android, iOS, Linux, FreeBSD, NetBSD
- License: MPL/GPL/LGPL
- Website: www.cliqz.com search4tor7txuze.onion ^{(Accessing link help)}
- Repository: github.com/cliqz-oss

Cliqz was a privacy-oriented web browser and search engine developed by Cliqz GmbH and majority-owned by Hubert Burda Media. It was available as a desktop and mobile web browser, as well as an extension for Firefox.

== Composition ==
It is a fork of the Firefox web browser with privacy-oriented changes, among which are a crowdsourced anti-tracking mechanism and an in-house search engine embedded within the browser, utilizing its own index of web pages to produce suggestions within the address bar drop-down menu rather than on separate pages. Upon receiving investment from Mozilla, Cliqz's CEO argued that privacy-focused search engines that do not have their own search index may still pass the user's IP address to third-party search providers.

== History ==
In August 2016, Mozilla, the developer of Firefox, made a minority investment in Cliqz. Cliqz planned to eventually monetize the software through a program known as Cliqz Offers, which would deliver sponsored offers to users based on their interests and browsing history. However, these recommendations would be processed locally based on a remote repository of offers, with no personally identifiable data sent to remote servers.

On 15 February 2017, Cliqz International GmbH, a wholly owned subsidiary of Cliqz GmbH, acquired the privacy-oriented browser extension Ghostery.

On 29 April 2020, Cliqz announced it would shut down its browser and search engine. Subsequently, the search engine - called Tailcat - was acquired by Brave.

As of March 2021, a browser called Ghostery Dawn was reported to be under development. Ghostery Dawn became available for public download in October 2021.

== Integration with Firefox ==
On 6 October 2017, Mozilla announced a test in which approximately 1% of users downloading Firefox in Germany would receive a version with Cliqz software preinstalled. The feature provided recommendations directly in the browser's search field. Recommendations included news, weather, sports, and other websites and were based on the user's browsing history and activities. The press release noted that "Users who receive a version of Firefox with Cliqz will have their browsing activity sent to Cliqz servers, including the URLs of pages they visit," and that "Cliqz uses several techniques to attempt to remove sensitive information from this browsing data before it is sent from Firefox."

According to the Firefox support website, this version of Firefox collects and sends data to the Cliqz corporation, including text typed in the address bar, queries to other search engines, information about visited webpages, and interactions with them, including mouse movement, scrolling, and amount of time spent; and the user's interactions with the user interface of the Cliqz software. Interaction data collected and sent to the Mozilla Corporation includes, among other things, counts of visits to search engine pages, which search engines are used, and a Cliqz identifier. Data collection is enabled by default; users must actively opt out if they do not wish their data to be transmitted.

== iOS app ==
In 2019, Cliqz released a version of their browser for iOS called Lumen. It natively leveraged Cliqz's search engine, Human Web, and supported ad-blocking and other privacy features, like an optional built-in VPN with access to 25 countries. The VPN network was owned and managed as part of a partnership with FoxyProxy.
