= AdChoices =

Internet-based advertising program

AdChoices logo

AdChoices is a self-regulatory program for online interest-based advertising that exists in the United States, Canada and across Europe. The program calls for advertising companies to establish and enforce responsible privacy practices for interest-based advertising, aimed to give consumers enhanced transparency and control. Companies adhere to a set of principles that are enforced by accountability programs.

"Interest-based advertising" (also known as "online behavioural advertising" or "behavioral targeting") selectively displays ads based on browsing history, primarily using cookies, to users most likely to identify with and respond to the ad's specific content. The AdChoices icon is shown automatically by companies as part of the self-regulatory program, and is meant to indicate to consumers when interest-based advertising data is being collected or used. By clicking on the icon (which is usually found in the top right corner of an online advertisement), a consumer can learn more about the ad or a website's collection practices, and be provided with the ability to opt-out of such targeting.

Although it is possible to opt out of interest-based advertising through the AdChoices program(s), opting out does not block advertisements nor prevent tracking of web browsing history by use of other ways (e.g. Flash cookies). The US and Canadian AdChoices programs require that participating companies not use Flash cookies or similar locally shared objects for online interest-based advertising purposes.

== History ==
In 2009, the Federal Trade Commission began looking into internet advertising platforms and suggested that the industry develop guidelines for self-regulation. The American Association of Advertising Agencies, the Association of National Advertisers (ANA), the American Advertising Federation (AAF), the Direct Marketing Association (DMA), the Interactive Advertising Bureau (IAB), the Better Business Bureau (BBB), and the Network Advertising Initiative (NAI) joined together to form the Self-Regulatory Program for Online Behavioral Advertising. The alliance managing the program was called the Digital Advertising Alliance (DAA). The DAA's AdChoices program was launched in October 2010. The program calls for companies to follow responsible privacy principles for internet-based advertising. Compliance with the DAA Principles is independently enforced for all companies in digital advertising by the Digital Advertising Accountability Program (DAAP) of the BBB National Programs and the accountability division of the Association of National Advertisers.

In July 2013, additional principles were launched by the DAA to address interest-based data collected from smartphones and tablets. To give consumers a choice mechanism for that environment, in February 2015, the DAA officially launched AppChoices, an opt-out app for mobile devices.

In September 2013, the Canadian version of the AdChoices program was launched by the Digital Advertising Alliance of Canada (DAAC), composed of a similar set of marketing and communications trade associations as in the US, to address the Office of the Privacy Commissioner of Canada (OPC)'s guidelines for online behavioural advertising. The AdChoices program can be implemented in a manner consistent with existing Canadian privacy laws and the OPC's guidelines for online interest-based advertising.

== Participants ==
The AdChoices self-regulatory programs have over 200 participants. Participants include AOL, AT&T, Bloomberg, Comcast, Conde Nast, Dow Jones, Facebook, General Motors, Google LLC, Microsoft, Procter & Gamble, Taboola, Yahoo!, and many others.

Lists of Canadian and European program participants are found on their official websites.

== Reception ==
A study conducted by Parks Associates and discussed in AdAge found that three years after the introduction of the AdChoices icon, most consumers were unaware of it, and in fact, awareness had grown only from 5% in 2011 to 6% in 2013. According to a TRUSTe survey from 2015: "However, research also showed that awareness of the AdChoices icon, part of the Digital Advertising Alliance (DAA) Self-Regulatory Program for OBA [online behavioral ads, or interest-based ads] jumped to 37% – a significant increase from 21% the previous year. This program provides users with more control over their online ad experience with the option to opt-out of personal targeting." Furthermore, in 10 of 13 European countries surveyed by TRUSTe and the European Interactive Digital Advertising Alliance in December 2015, at least 1 in 4 consumers who are aware of the icon say they have clicked on it.
