= C*Base =

C*Base is a popular bulletin board system software for the Commodore 64.

== History ==
C*Base was originally programmed by Gunther Birznieks of Bethesda, Maryland. It was written in Commodore BASIC 2.0, with some speed-critical routines hand-coded in 6502 machine language; the BASIC portion was compiled with the Blitz! compiler. Birznieks cites CMBBS, Color64, and C-Net as his influences.

After Birznieks stopped working with Commodore computers some time after the release of C*Base 3.1, he transferred control of the program to Jerome P. Yoner living in Brandon, Manitoba, Canada at the time. Copyright and maintenance of C*Base were later entrusted to David Weinehall of Tavelsjö, Sweden, who rereleased the project under the GNU GPL-2.0-or-later.

As of 2025, the current version is 3.3.7.

== Features ==
C*Base proved popular for a number of reasons, not least of which was its almost limitless configurability and its support for a wide range of standard and third-party peripherals.

=== Hardware ===
A Commodore 64 (or Commodore 128 in 64 mode) is required to run C*Base. All CBM and CMD floppy and hard drives are supported, as well as the Lt. Kernal hard drive. Modem baud rates up to 2400 are supported through the user port, and up to 9600 through the cartridge port. The program is fully compatible with CPU and disk accelerators such as TurboMaster and JiffyDOS.

=== Communication ===
The program interoperates well with both Commodore and non-Commodore terminal programs; it supports ASCII, ANSI, and PETSCII output in 40 or 80 columns. Punter and XMODEM protocols are used for file transfers.

In version 3.1, full networking support for message bases was introduced, making C*Base one of the only Commodore bulletin boards capable of networking.
