= Brave (web browser) =

Chromium-based open-source web browser

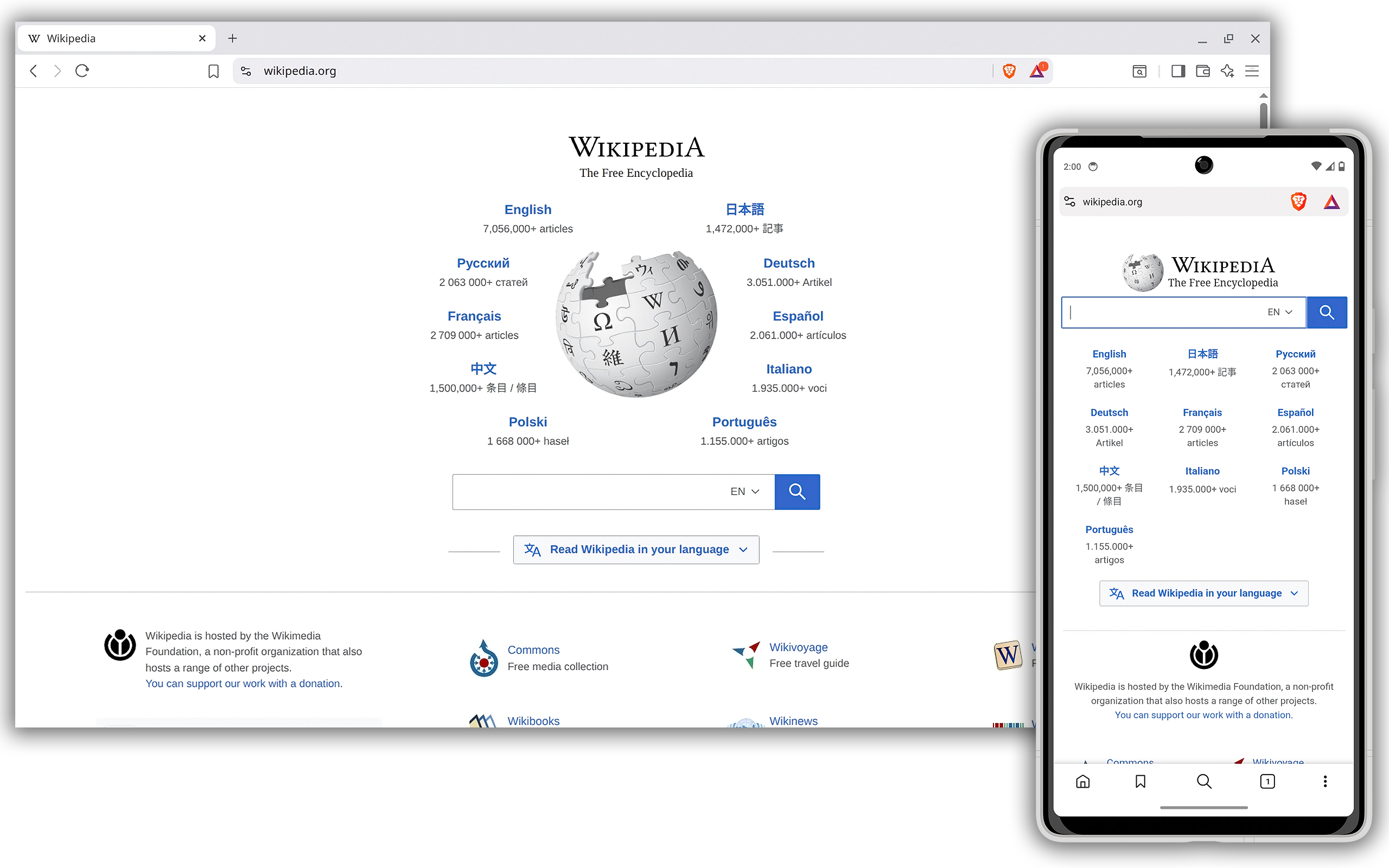
- Desktop and mobile versions of Brave, displaying the home page of Wikipedia
- Developers: Brave Software, Inc.
- Release: 20 January 2016; 10 years ago
- Stable release: 1.100.58 / 18 November 2026; 4 days ago
- Preview release: 1.87.179 / 30 January 2026; 9 months ago
- Written in: JavaScript, Swift, C++
- Engines: Blink, V8, (WebKit on iOS/iPadOS)
- Operating system: Android 10 and later; iOS 18 and later; iPadOS 18 and later; Linux; macOS 13 and later; Windows 10 and later
- Platform: x86, x86-64, IA-32, ARM, AArch64
- Available in: Nearly 160 languages
- Type: Web browser
- License: MPL 2.0
- Website: brave.com
- Repository: github.com/brave/brave-browser

Brave is a free and open-source web browser which was first released in 2016. It is developed by US-based Brave Software, Inc. and based on the Chromium web browser. Brave is marketed as a privacy-focused web browser and includes features such as built-in advertisement blocking, protections against browser fingerprinting and a private browsing mode that integrates the Tor anonymity network. Brave also incorporates its own advertising through a rewards system based on cryptocurrency, which allows users to earn Basic Attention Tokens (BAT) by opting-in to view ads served through its ad network. While Brave has been praised for its privacy protections and features, it has faced criticism over early plans to replace publisher's ads with its own and missteps surrounding its handling of affiliate links and privacy vulnerabilities in its private browsing mode.

== History ==
=== Founding and early development (2015–2016) ===
Brave Software was founded in 2015 by Brendan Eich, creator of JavaScript and former Mozilla CEO, and Brian Bondy, a programmer who had formerly worked at Mozilla. In 2016, the company released the Brave browser positioning it as a privacy-focused browser that blocks ads and trackers by default. Early plans for the browser proposed creating a system through which Brave could replace the ads shown by websites with advertisements of its own in a manner that would be privacy preserving.

=== Acquisitions and transitions (2016–2018) ===
In 2016, Brave Software acquired Link Bubble, an Android web browser that preloaded websites in floating bubbles before users clicked on links while browsing text on their phones. The Link Bubble app was subsequently re-branded into the Brave browser. However, the unfamiliar interface, along with limitations in how Android's WebView engine handled rendering websites on background threads, led Brave to separate the two products in 2017. Brave was re-released as a conventional tabbed browser, while Link Bubble continued as a standalone app.

In August 2016, the company had received at least US$7 million in angel investments from venture capital firms, including Peter Thiel's Founders Fund, Propel Venture Partners, Pantera Capital, Foundation Capital and the Digital Currency Group.

In 2017, Brave introduced the Basic Attention Token (BAT), an Ethereum-based cryptocurrency. Brave intended for it to be used as a medium through which publishers and content creators, who would have typically relied on advertising revenue, to be paid directly by the person viewing the content. The project raised approximately $35 million through an initial coin offering and was eventually integrated into the Brave Rewards system in 2018 where users could watch ads through the browser which would in turn earn them the token, which they could subsequently share with creators and publishers.

Until late 2018, Brave was built using a fork of Electron called Muon, which the company claimed offered improved security over the standard Electron framework. In October 2018, Brave announced that it would transition to building the browser on top of the Chromium codebase. Chromium also served as the foundational codebase for browsers like Google Chrome, Vivaldi and Opera at that time. Despite Chromium being maintained by Google, Brave stated that it would not integrate any Google services into the browser. The company cited the need to reduce the maintenance burden of supporting a custom user-interface framework as the primary motivation for the change. According to Brave, the switch resulted in a 22 percent performance improvement over earlier versions. The final Muon-based version of Brave was released in January 2019, after which the Muon variant was declared end-of-life and users were encouraged to migrate to the Chromium-based version.

=== Expansion (2019–present) ===
In 2019, Brave released their 1.0 version across all platforms, the 1.0 version signaled that the browser was finally out of beta and was ready for mass adoption. The 1.0 released the Brave Ads system to their iOS browser version and introduced a way for users to sell their Basic Attention Tokens on cryptocurrency exchanges through a partnership with a cryptocurrency exchange company called Uphold. Users who signed up to accounts on Uphold were able to exchange their BATs for an equivalent amount US dollars.

In 2020, Brave introduced Brave Today, a privacy-preserving news feed integrated into the browser's new tab page. The feature delivered personalized news content without revealing users' IP addresses to publishers or ad networks, using Brave's custom content delivery network (CDN). However, Gizmodo noted that while the feed avoided third-party tracking, users could still be shown ads through Brave's own Brave Ads program instead of publisher-served ads. The feature was later renamed Brave News. Later that year, a user discovered the Brave browser inserted referral codes to the end of URLs of cryptocurrency companies. Brave specifically targeted cryptocurrency exchanges like Binance, Coinbase and Trezor with which it had advertising agreements. Brave also added their referral codes to web search links when a user searched the terms "bitcoin", "ethereum" or "litecoin" in their browser. In response to the criticism after this practice was discovered, the CEO, Brendan Eich said that the addition of the referral codes in the URL bar was a mistake and that the addition of such advertising would be made opt-in.

In March 2021, Brave Software announced that they would acquire Tailcat, a search engine developed by the team that was formerly responsible for the privacy search and browser products at Cliqz, the company that owned the popular privacy browser extension Ghostery. In October 2021, Tailcat was rebranded Brave Search and became Brave's default search engine on new installations. In the same year, Brave also launched a cryptocurrency wallet built into the browser claiming that it was less susceptible to phishing than similar products by MetaMask which could be installed as browser extensions. Brave also claimed that their implementation required less CPU resources to operate. During its launch it primarily supported Ethereum or Ethereum-based blockchains and did not have support for Bitcoin or Dogecoin cryptocurrencies.

In 2023, Brave launched Brave Leo, a privacy-preserving large-language model that would power AI features inside the browser like a chatbot that would summarize web pages and answer questions about a page. To prevent user-data from reaching the large-language model providers, Brave claimed to use a HTTPS proxy and host models on their own servers. When a user made a request, the request was routed through Brave's server that would hide and obfuscate the user's IP address, Brave claims to store no logs of user's interactions on their servers. In 2024, the models were rolled out to Android and iOS devices and AI was subsequently integrated into Brave Search as well.

In May 2025, Brave introduced the .brave top-level domain in a partnership with Unstoppable Domains. It is offered to users of the Brave browser, allowing them to host decentralized websites using the InterPlanetary File System (IPFS). Websites using .brave as a top-level domain cannot be resolved on browsers other than Brave, as it is not currently an official ICANN registered domain.

As of October 2025, Brave announced that they had achieved 100 million monthly active users and 42 million daily active users.

In June 2026, Brave launched the stable release of Brave Origin, a version of the browser without the revenue-generating features. A one-time payment gives access to Brave Origin, although payment is not necessary on Linux systems.

== Reception ==
=== Privacy ===
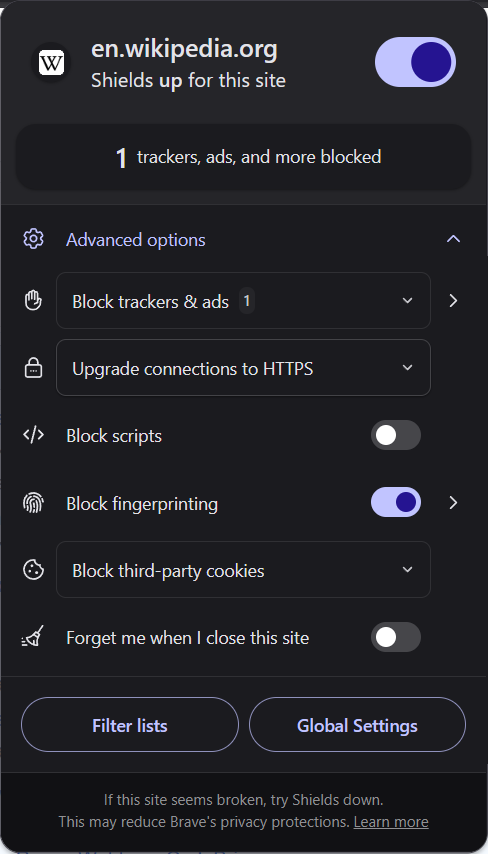
Brave detects one tracker or ad on Wikipedia.

Reception of the Brave browser has been mixed. The browser has received coverage for its privacy-focused features, including its built-in ad blocker and protections against tracking techniques such as browser fingerprinting, local port enumeration, cross-site leaks, and bounce tracking. These features are bundled under the Brave Shields system, which comes enabled by default. Brave also includes a Private Window mode that routes browsing activity through the Tor network, that claimed to increase anonymity when accessing websites. Independent tests have generally supported some of Brave's privacy claims. In tests conducted by the Electronic Frontier Foundation's Cover Your Tracks project, Brave was one of the few browsers to receive a "strong protection" rating and was found to include randomized fingerprinting protections. Similarly, Brave scores highly on PrivacyTests.org, a comparison site maintained by privacy researcher Arthur Edelstein. While Edelstein is employed by Brave Software, he has stated that the project is maintained independently of his work at the company. A 2021 academic study comparing data collection practices across browsers found that Brave transmitted the least amount of identifying data to its parent company.

However, Brave's privacy practices have not been without criticism. In 2020, the company was found to be appending affiliate referral codes to the end of certain cryptocurrency exchange URLs typed into the browser's address bar. The practice applied to exchanges such as Binance and Coinbase, and was later discovered to extend to suggested search queries for terms like "bitcoin" and "ethereum". Following media attention, Brave CEO Brendan Eich called the behavior a mistake, and stated that the use of affiliate content would be made opt-in going forward. The browser's Private Window with Tor feature has also been subject to scrutiny. In 2021, researchers reported that DNS queries for .onion addresses were being leaked outside of the Tor network due to a misconfiguration in how Brave handled name resolution. The company later patched the issue. In 2022, Brave faced further criticism for bundling its paid virtual private network (VPN) product, Brave Firewall + VPN, into installations of its Windows browser, even for users who had not subscribed to the service.

In April 2026, Firefox 149 shipped adblock-rs component of Brave for experimentation to improve the Enhanced Tracking Protection feature of Firefox.

=== Revenue model ===
Brave's revenue model has also been the subject of debate. The browser originally proposed replacing ads on websites with its own privacy-preserving advertisements and sharing revenue with publishers. This plan was met with concern by web publishers who argued that Brave was redirecting revenue streams that would have otherwise gone to content creators and publishers. In 2018, English presenter Tom Scott revealed that users had tipped his YouTube channel through the Brave Rewards program despite him not having signed up for the program or consenting to receive funds. Scott noted that Brave had not paid him the tipped money and did not clearly show users that he was not enrolled in the program. In response, Brave subsequently updated the system to return unclaimed tips when the intended recipient was not verified with the platform and correctly show publishers who were not affiliated with the platform.

== See also ==
- Brave Search
