= AdGuard =

Ad blocking and privacy protection for everyone software

- Genre: Utility; Browser extension Server; DNS resolver
- Founded: 1 June 2009
- Headquarters: Limassol, Cyprus
- ASN: 212772
- Website: adguard.com

AdGuard is a Cypriot company primarily offering ad blocking services. They offer dedicated ad blocking applications, browser extensions, a DNS resolver, and a VPN service.

== History ==
AdGuard was founded as a private company in Moscow, Russia in 2009, then later moved its headquarters to Cyprus.

During late 2014, the distribution of AdGuard's app for Android was removed from Google Play. It has since been made available for download from the developer's own website.

From the summer of 2018 to the summer of 2019, AdGuard for iOS received no updates due to Apple policies at the time against ad blocking via the iOS VPN APIs.

In September 2018, AdGuard was hit by credential stuffing attack. AdGuard claims that their servers were not compromised and instead attackers used credential pairs reused by victims on other sites and stolen from those other sites. According to company spokesperson, they "do not know what accounts exactly were accessed by the attackers," so the company had reset passwords for all accounts "as a precautionary measure". Also, AdGuard pledged to use "Have I Been Pwned?" API to check all new passwords for appearance in known public data leaks. Furthermore, they implemented more strict password security requirements.

In November 2020, Microsoft Edge Store and Chrome web store were infiltrated with fraudulent add-ons posing as various legitimate VPN browser add-ons, including NordVPN and AdGuard's VPN add-on. Subsequently, Microsoft and Google were alerted and actions were taken to remove the fake add-ons in the various browser stores.

== Features ==
=== AdGuard Home ===
AdGuard Home acts as a recursive DNS resolver, which prevents most advertisements from displaying by responding with an invalid address for domains that appear in its filter lists.

=== AdGuard Browser extensions ===
The browser extension blocks video ads, interstitial ads, floating ads, pop-ups, banners, and text ads. It is also able to handle anti-AdBlock scripts. AdGuard blocks spyware and warns users of malicious websites. AdGuard Content Blocker is an additional browser extension for Yandex Browser and Samsung Internet, which uses Content Blocker API. It downloads filter list updates and requests browsers to enforce them via Content Blocker API.

=== AdGuard applications ===
AdGuard has Windows and Mac versions, as well as native mobile versions for Android and iOS. The application can set up a local VPN, filtering all traffic on the mobile device.

=== AdGuard DNS ===
AdGuard operates recursive name servers for public use. AdGuard DNS supports encryption over DNSCrypt, DNS over HTTPS, DNS over TLS, and DNS over QUIC. AdGuard began testing the DNS service back in 2016, and officially launched it in 2018.

	Default	Unfiltered	Family protection
Filters domains	Yes	No	Yes
Validates DNSSEC	Yes	Yes	Yes
Passes ECS	Partial	Partial	Partial
Via DoH	https://dns.adguard-dns.com/dns-query	https://unfiltered.adguard-dns.com/dns-query	https://family.adguard-dns.com/dns-query
Via DoT and DoQ	dns.adguard-dns.com	unfiltered.adguard-dns.com	family.adguard-dns.com
Via IPv4	94.140.14.14 94.140.15.15	94.140.14.140 94.140.14.141	94.140.14.15 94.140.15.16
Via IPv6	2a10:50c0::ad1:ff 2a10:50c0::ad2:ff	2a10:50c0::1:ff 2a10:50c0::2:ff	2a10:50c0::bad1:ff 2a10:50c0::bad2:ff

== Research ==
AdGuard developers have taken up research in order to inform wider audiences on user privacy, cybersecurity and data protection. The following issues are cases involving the developers:

- Websites involved in crypto jacking
- Facebook Ad Network widespread distribution
- Alerting or reporting of fake ad blockers
- Popular Android and iOS app privacy issues

== See also ==
- AdBlock
- Adblock Plus
- uBlock Origin
- AdAway
- Pi-hole
