= List of recommended Mozilla WebExtensions =

List of Firefox extensions

A list of all Mozilla-recommended browser extensions on the Firefox Add-ons store (as of April 20, 2026).

== Firefox ==
Name	License	Available on Firefox for Android	Description	Categories
'Improve YouTube!' 🎧 (For YouTube & Video)	Friendly License	Yes	Youtube Extension. Powerful but lightweight. Enrich your Youtube and content selection. Make YouTube tidy and smart! (Layout, Filters, Shortcuts, Playlist)	Appearance + Photos, Music & Videos + Tabs
Adaptive Tab Bar Color	MIT	No	Changes the color of Firefox theme to match the website’s appearance.	Appearance + Tabs
AdBlocker for YouTube™	MPL-2.0	No	Remove all annoying ads from YouTube.	Privacy & Security + Appearance + Photos, Music & Videos
AdGuard AdBlocker	GPL-3.0	Yes	Unmatched adblock extension against advertising and pop-ups. Blocks ads on Facebook, Youtube and all other websites.	Privacy & Security
Audio Equalizer	MPL-2.0	No	Stylish audio equalizer in toolbar popup.	Appearance + Photos, Music & Videos + Tabs
Augmented Steam	GPL-3.0	No	Augments your Steam Experience	Shopping + Games & Entertainment
Auto Tab Discard	MPL-2.0	Yes	Increase browser speed and reduce memory load and when you have numerous open tabs.	Appearance + Tabs
automaticDark - Time-Based Theme Changer	MIT	No	Automatically change Firefox's theme based on the time.	Appearance
Awesome Screenshot & Screen	MPL-2.0	Yes	Full page screen capture and screen recorder 2 in 1. Share screencast video instantly.	Photos, Music & Videos + Social & Communication
BetterTTV	All rights reserved	No	Enhances Twitch and YouTube with new features, emotes, and more.	Social & Communication + Games & Entertainment
Bitwarden Password Manager	GPL-3.0	Yes	At home, at work, or on the go, Bitwarden easily secures all your passwords, passkeys, and sensitive information.	Privacy & Security
Block Site	MPL-2.0	No	A customizable, password-protected website blocker and redirector.	Privacy & Security + Appearance + Tabs
CanvasBlocker	MPL-2.0	Yes	Alters some JS APIs to prevent fingerprinting.	Privacy & Security
Checker Plus for Gmail™	All rights reserved	No	Get desktop notifications, read, listen or delete emails without opening Gmail or Inbox by Gmail & easily manage multiple accounts.	Feeds, News & Blogging + Appearance + Social & Communication + Alerts & Updates
Chrome Mask	MIT	Yes	Makes Firefox wear a mask to look like Chrome to websites that block Firefox otherwise.	Web Development
Clear Browsing Data	GPL-3.0	No	Delete browsing data directly from the browser toolbar. Clear cookies, history and cache with a single click.	Web Development + Privacy & Security
Clear Cache	MPL-2.0	Yes	Advanced cache clearing with time periods, current tab filter, and smart notifications. Perfect for developers and power users. F9 shortcut included!	Web Development + Privacy & Security + Search Tools
ClearURLs	GPL-3.0	Yes	Removes tracking elements from URLs	Privacy & Security
Clippings	MPL-2.0	No	Save frequently-entered text for pasting later.	Feeds, News & Blogging + Social & Communication
Consent-O-Matic	MIT	Yes	Automatic handling of GDPR consent forms	Privacy & Security
Control Panel for Twitter	MIT	Yes	Gives you more control over Twitter and adds missing features and UI improvements	Social & Communication
Copy PlainText	MPL-2.0	No	Copy Plain Text without any formatting	Search Tools + Appearance + Social & Communication
Custom Scrollbars	MPL-2.0	No	Give Firefox a personal touch with customized scrollbars!	Appearance
Dark Background and Light Text	MPL-2.0	Yes	Make every web page (or just the pages you want) display light text on dark backgrounds. All color variations are fully customizable.	Appearance
Dark Reader	MIT	Yes	Dark mode for every website. Take care of your eyes, use dark theme for night and daily browsing.	Web Development + Appearance + Other
Decentraleyes	MPL-2.0	Yes	Protects you against tracking through "free", centralized, content delivery. It prevents a lot of requests from reaching networks like Google Hosted Libraries, and serves local files to keep sites from breaking. Complements regular content blockers.	Privacy & Security
Default Bookmark Folder	MIT	No	Allows you to choose the default bookmark location folder and quickly bookmark pages via a dedicated icon.	Bookmarks + Other
Dictionary Anywhere	GPL-3.0	No	View definitions easily as you browse the web. Double-click any word to view its definition in a small pop-up bubble. It also supports Spanish, German, French language alongside English. Enjoy Reading Uninterrupted!!!.	Search Tools + Language Support + Other
Disconnect	GPL-3.0	No	Make the web faster, more private, and more secure.	Web Development + Privacy & Security
Don't track me Google	MIT	Yes	Removes the annoying link-conversion at Google Search / maps / ...	Privacy & Security + Search Tools
Download All Images	MPL-2.0	No	Easily save images with a wide range of customization features, such as file size, dimensions, and image type.	Web Development + Photos, Music & Videos
Download Manager (S3)	MPL-2.0	Yes	View and manage downloads from a tidy status bar.	Download Management
DownThemAll!	GPL-2.0	No	The Mass Downloader for your browser	Download Management
DuckDuckGo Search & Tracker Protection	Apache License 2.0	No	Actively protects your data in your current browser	Privacy & Security + Search Tools
Easy Youtube Video Downloader Express	MPL-2.0	No	A simple extension for superfast and easy YouTube downloads in FLV, 3GP, MP3, MP4, 720p, and 1080p formats.	Download Management + Photos, Music & Videos
Emoji	MPL-2.0	Yes	It permits just with a single click to copy an emoji. There is a search-box and the "Most used emojis" section (the first one). If you want to send feedback or report bug, please contact me	Search Tools + Appearance
EPUBReader	All rights reserved	No	Read ePub files right in Firefox. No additional software needed!	Other
Feedbro	All rights reserved	No	Advanced Feed Reader - Read news & blogs or any RSS/Atom/RDF source.	Feeds, News & Blogging + Photos, Music & Videos
Flagfox	All rights reserved	No	Displays a country flag depicting the location of the current website's server and provides a multitude of tools such as site safety checks, whois, translation, similar sites, validation, URL shortening, and more...	Web Development + Alerts & Updates
Forecastfox	MPL-2.0	No	International weather forecasts with easy and convenient settings	Feeds, News & Blogging + Appearance
FoxClocks	All rights reserved	No	FoxClocks shows times around the world - or just your local time - at the bottom of your browser. It deals with daylight saving time so you don't have to.	Social & Communication
Foxy Gestures	GPL-3.0	No	Mouse gestures for Firefox. A web extension alternative to FireGestures created by a long time FireGestures user.	Appearance + Other
FoxyProxy Standard	GPL-2.0	Yes	FoxyProxy is an open-source, advanced proxy management tool that completely replaces Firefox's limited proxying capabilities. No paid accounts are necessary; bring your own proxies or buy from any vendor. The original proxy tool, since 2006.	Web Development + Privacy & Security
FoxyTab	MPL-2.0	No	Collection of Tab Related Actions e.g. Duplicate, Close Duplicates, Close to the Left, Copy Title, Merge Windows, Save as PDF, Copy Urls Tab/All/Left/Right, Host keep/close/close other, Sort by URL/Title, Asce/Desc, Move, Reload, Reload Timer	Privacy & Security + Tabs
Gesturefy	GPL-3.0	No	Navigate, operate, and browse faster with mouse gestures! A customizable mouse gesture add-on with a variety of different commands.	Appearance + Other
Ghostery – Privacy Ad Blocker	MPL-2.0	Yes	The best privacy tool and ad blocker extension for Firefox. Stop trackers, speed up websites and block ads everywhere including YouTube and Facebook.	Web Development + Privacy & Security
GIPHY for Firefox	MIT	Yes	Bring the power of a GIF search engine anywhere on the web. Respond to emails, tweets and more with GIFs quickly and easily. Add GIPHY GIFs to your Gmail, Facebook, Twitter and more. Just search, drag and drop or right click!	Search Tools
History Cleaner	MIT	No	Deletes browsing history older than a specified number of days.	Privacy & Security
Image Max URL	Apache-2.0	No	Finds larger/original versions of images (supporting 10,000+ websites), including a powerful media popup feature	Photos, Music & Videos
Image Search Options	MPL 1.1	No	A customizable reverse image search tool that conveniently presents a variety of top image search engines.	Search Tools + Photos, Music & Videos
Imagus	All rights reserved	Yes	With a simple mouse-over you can enlarge images and display images/videos from links.	Photos, Music & Videos
Immersive Translate - Translate Website & PDF	All rights reserved	Yes	Free Translate Website, Translate PDF & Epub eBook, Translate Video Subtitles in Bilingual	Appearance + Language Support
LeechBlock NG	MPL-2.0	Yes	LeechBlock NG is a simple productivity tool designed to block those time-wasting sites that can suck the life out of your working day. All you need to do is specify which sites to block and when to block them.	Other
Link Gopher	GPL-3.0	No	Extracts all links from web page, sorts them, removes duplicates, and displays them in a new tab for inspection or copy and paste into other systems.	Other
Livemarks	MIT	No	Get auto-updated RSS feed bookmark folders.	Feeds, News & Blogging + Alerts & Updates
Measure-it	GPL-3.0	No	Draw a ruler across any webpage to check the width, height, or alignment of page elements in pixels.	Web Development + Appearance
New Tab Override	MPL-2.0	No	New Tab Override allows you to set the page that shows whenever you open a new tab.	Tabs
NoScript Security Suite	GPL-2.0	Yes	The best security you can get in a web browser! Allow potentially malicious web content to run only from sites you trust. Protect yourself against XSS other web security exploits.	Privacy & Security + Alerts & Updates
Notefox: websites notes	MPL-2.0	Yes	Take notes on every website in a smart and simple way!	Appearance + Tabs
OneTab	Apache License 2.0	Yes	OneTab - Too many tabs? Convert tabs to a list and reduce browser memory	Bookmarks + Tabs
PhotoShow	All rights reserved	No	Hover to zoom and view high-definition images. Instantly enlarge visuals, crafted for all your favorite websites—and for you.	Photos, Music & Videos + Social & Communication + Shopping
PocketTube: Youtube Subscription Manager	MPL-2.0	No	The best way to group your subscriptions Using this simple extension you can create collections that seamlessly fit into YouTube's layout.	Feeds, News & Blogging + Social & Communication
Popup Blocker (strict)	MPL-2.0	Yes	Strictly block all popup requests from any website by default. A notification window is opened to allow you accept, reject, open the popup in background page, or redirect the current page to popup address	Privacy & Security + Tabs
PopUpOFF	Apache License 2.0	No	Removes and prevents popups, overlays and cookie notifications, other tools do not. Enjoy the original look of the internet.	Privacy & Security + Appearance
Port Authority	GPL-2.0	No	Blocks malicious websites from port-scanning your computer/network and dynamically blocks all LexisNexis endpoints from running their invasive data collection scripts.	Web Development + Privacy & Security
Power Thesaurus	MPL-2.0	No	Use the power of synonyms by button in toolbar, right-click or by word selection on any page.	Language Support + Social & Communication
Print Edit WE	GPL-2.0	No	Edit the contents of a web page prior to printing or saving. Elements in the web page can be edited, formatted, hidden or deleted. Unwanted content, such as adverts and sidebars, can easily be removed.	Appearance
Privacy Badger	GPL-3.0	Yes	Automatically learns to block hidden trackers. Made by the leading digital rights nonprofit EFF to stop companies from spying on you.	Privacy & Security
Raindrop.io	MPL-2.0	No	All-in-one bookmark manager	Feeds, News & Blogging + Bookmarks + Tabs
Read Aloud: A Text to Speech Voice Reader	GPL-3.0	Yes	Read out loud the current web-page article with one click. Supports 40+ languages.	Feeds, News & Blogging + Appearance + Language Support
Return YouTube Dislike	GPL-3.0	No	Returns ability to see dislike statistics on youtube	Social & Communication + Other
RoboForm Password Manager	All rights reserved	No	RoboForm, the #1 ranked Password Manager makes your life easier by remembering passwords and logging you into websites automatically	Privacy & Security + Social & Communication + Other
ScrollAnywhere	All rights reserved	No	Scroll page without touching scroll-bar! Press Middle (Right / Left) mouse button anywhere on the page to scroll just like with scrollbar. Features also: - "grab and drag" scrolling - customizable scrollbars! - the Momentum auto-scroll	Search Tools + Appearance
Search by Image	GPL-3.0	Yes	A powerful reverse image search tool, with support for various search engines, such as Google, Bing, Yandex, Baidu and TinEye.	Search Tools + Photos, Music & Videos + Shopping
Show Video Controls for Firefox	GPL-3.0	Yes	Automatically enables video controls when playing html webm videos.	Feeds, News & Blogging + Photos, Music & Videos + Games & Entertainment
Sidebery	MIT	No	Vertical tabs tree and bookmarks in sidebar with advanced containers configuration, grouping and many other features.	Bookmarks + Tabs
Simple Tab Groups	MPL-2.0	No	Create, modify, and quickly change tab groups	Appearance + Other + Tabs
Simple Translate	MPL-2.0	No	Quickly translate selected or typed text on web pages. Supports Google Translate and DeepL API.	Language Support
SingleFile	GPL-3.0	Yes	Save an entire web page—including images and styling—as a single HTML file.	Download Management + Privacy & Security
Sink It for Reddit	All rights reserved	Yes	Upgrade your Reddit experience with color coded comments, easier nav, sub-reddit blocking, gestures for upvoting, ad+nag blocking, and more. It's like RES, for mobile!	Feeds, News & Blogging + Games & Entertainment
Snap Links Plus	MIT	No	Select a number of links with a rectangle and open them in new tabs. You can also lasso checkboxes to quickly check or uncheck them. Works with radio buttons as well.	Feeds, News & Blogging + Appearance + Tabs
SoundFixer	Unlicense	Yes	Helps you fix annoying sound problems on sites like YouTube: audio in one channel only, too quiet or too loud. (Unfortunately, this extension does not work on all websites because of cross-domain issues — but it does work on YouTube!)	Photos, Music & Videos + Other
SponsorBlock - Skip Sponsorships on YouTube	GPL-3.0	Yes	Easily skip YouTube video sponsors. When you visit a YouTube video, the extension will check the database for reported sponsors and automatically skip known sponsors. You can also report sponsors in videos.	Appearance + Games & Entertainment
SteamDB	BSD 2-Clause	Yes	Adds SteamDB links and new features on the Steam store and community. View lowest game prices and stats.	Shopping + Games & Entertainment
Stylebot	MIT	No	Change the appearance of the web instantly	Web Development + Appearance
Stylus	GPL-3.0	Yes	Redesign your favorite websites with Stylus, an actively developed and community driven userstyles manager. Easily install custom themes from popular online repositories, or create, edit, and manage your own personalized CSS stylesheets.	Web Development + Appearance
Swift Selection Search	MIT	No	Swiftly access your search engines in a popup panel when you select text in a webpage. Context menu also included!	Search Tools + Other
Tab Reloader (page auto refresh)	MPL-2.0	No	An easy-to-use tab reloader with custom reloading time settings for individual tabs	Web Development + Tabs
Tab Session Manager	MPL-2.0	No	Save and restore the state of windows and tabs. It also supports automatic saving and cloud sync.	Appearance + Tabs
Tab Stash	MPL-2.0	No	Easily save and organize batches of tabs as bookmarks. Clear your tabs, clear your mind. Only for Firefox.	Bookmarks + Tabs
Tabby - Window & Tab Manager	MPL-2.0	No	Tabby helps you manage a lot of windows and tabs easily; it can help you open, close, move, pin, and do many other things on tabs and windows quickly. With Tabby, you can even save all you windows and tabs for later with just one click!	Search Tools + Tabs
Tabliss - New Tab	GPL-3.0	No	A beautiful New Tab page with many customisable backgrounds and widgets that does not require any permissions.	Appearance + Photos, Music & Videos + Other + Tabs
Time Tracker - Web Habit Builder	MIT	Yes	Track time, analyze your habits and block addictive sites	Other
TinEye Reverse Image Search	MIT	No	Click on any image on the web to search for it on TinEye. Recommended by Firefox! Discover where an image came from, see how it is being used, check if modified versions exist or locate high resolution versions. Made with love by the TinEye team.	Search Tools + Photos, Music & Videos
To Google Translate	MPL-2.0	No	Right-click a section of text and click the Translate icon next to it to text translate or listen to it in your language.	Feeds, News & Blogging + Appearance + Language Support
Tomato Clock	GPL-3.0	Yes	Tomato Clock is a simple browser extension that helps with online time management.	Alerts & Updates + Other
Tranquility Reader	GPL-3.0	No	Tranquility Reader improves the readability of web articles by removing unnecessary elements like ads, images, social sharing widgets, and other distracting fluff.	Feeds, News & Blogging + Appearance
Tree Style Tab	GPL-2.0	No	Show tabs like a tree.	Appearance + Tabs
Turbo Download Manager	MPL-2.0	No	A download manager with the ability to pause and resume downloads, download remote files, and more.	Download Management + Appearance + Games & Emtertainment
Turn Off the Lights for Firefox	GPL-2.0	Yes	The entire page will be fading to dark, so you can watch the videos as if you were in the cinema. Works for YouTube and Beyond. Dark mode for all websites. It works for all known video sites such as YouTube, Vimeo, Twitch, Dailymotion, Facebook, etc.	Appearance + Photos, Music & Videos
TWP - Translate Web Pages	MPL-2.0	Yes	Translate your page in real time using Google, Bing or Yandex. It is not necessary to open new tabs.	Language Support
uBlock Origin	GPL-3.0	Yes	Finally, an efficient wide-spectrum content blocker. Easy on CPU and memory.	Privacy & Security
Undo Close Tab	GPL-3.0	No	Allows you to restore the tab you just closed with a single click—plus it can offer a list of recently closed tabs within a convenient context menu.	Appearance + Tabs
Unhook: Remove YouTube Recommended Videos Comments	All rights reserved	Yes	Hide YouTube related videos, comments, video suggestions wall, homepage recommendations, trending tab, and other distractions.	Appearance + Photos, Music & Videos
User-Agent Switcher and Manager	MPL-2.0	No	Spoof websites trying to gather information about your web navigation—like your browser type and operating system—to deliver distinct content you may not want.	Web Development + Privacy & Security
Video DownloadHelper	All rights reserved	No	Download videos from the web. Easy, smart, No tracking.	Download Management
Weather Extension	MPL-2.0	No	The best way to see the weather right in your browser. Easier than looking outside!	Feeds, News & Blogging + Alerts & Updates
Web Archives	GPL-3.0	Yes	View archived and cached versions of web pages on various search engines, such as the Wayback Machine and Archive․is.	Feeds, News & Blogging + Search Tools
Webmail Ad Blocker	MPL 1.1	No	Remove advertising clutter from your web-based email. Expand your viewable area by blocking and removing ads on the right-hand side of the screen when using Gmail, Hotmail, Outlook.com and Yahoo Mail.	Appearance + Social & Communication
Worldwide Radio	MPL-2.0	Yes	Listen to live radio stations from around the world!	Feeds, News & Blogging + Photos, Music & Videos + Games & Entertainment
Yomitan	GPL-3.0	Yes	Powerful and versatile pop-up dictionary for language learning used by 100,000+ language learners.	Appearance + Language Support
YouTube High Definition	GPL-3.0	Yes	YouTube High Definition is a powerful tool that automatically plays all YouTube videos in HD, changes video player size, offers auto-stop and mute, and much more.	Photos, Music & Videos + Other + Games & Entertainment
YouTube NonStop	MIT	No	Tired of getting that "Video paused. Continue watching?" confirmation dialog? This extension autoclicks it, so you can listen to your favorite music uninterrupted. Working on YouTube and YouTube Music!	Photos, Music & Videos + Games & Entertainment
YouTube Screenshot Button	MPL-2.0	No	Take screenshots from YouTube Videos & YouTube Shorts. The addon adds screenshot button & also enables Shift+A shortcut.	Download Management + Appearance + Photos, Music & Videos
YouTube Search Fixer	GPL-3.0	No	Remove ALL distracting search results, redirect shorts back to legacy page and try little visual changes suited for low resolution screens.	Search Tools + Appearance + Social & Communication
Zoom Page WE	GPL-2.0	No	Zoom web pages (either per-site or per-tab) using full-page zoom, text-only zoom and minimum font size. Fit-to-width zooming can be applied to pages automatically. Fit-to-window scaling can be applied to small images.	Appearance
