= AD Block =

AD Block may refer to:

- Ad blocking, the blocking of advertisements in a web browser
- AdBlock, a content filtering and ad blocking extension for Google Chrome
- Adblock Plus, an open source ad blocking expansion
- AD block, a part of Bidhannagar, India
