= Video Download Helper =

Browser extension

Video DownloadHelper
- Developer: Michel Gutierrez (mig)
- Release: July 2006

Stable release(s) [±]
- Firefox: 7.6.0 / June 30, 2021; 5 years ago
- Chrome: 7.6.0.0 / July 1, 2021; 5 years ago
- Edge: 7.5.0.4 / March 12, 2021; 5 years ago
- Operating system: Cross-platform
- Type: Chrome extension; Mozilla extension
- License: Freemium
- Website: www.downloadhelper.net

Video Download Helper (previously spelled as Video DownloadHelper) is an extension for Firefox and Chrome web browsers. It allows the user to download videos from sites that stream videos through HTTP. The extension was developed by Michel Gutierrez.

== History ==
As of October 2026, Video Download Helper is the fourth most popular extension for Firefox (after Adblock Plus and uBlock Origin) and the third most popular Mozilla-recommended extension with 1,827,836 users.

In the second quarter of 2015, version 5 of the extension for Firefox was rebased using Mozilla's Add-ons SDK (previous versions used XUL).

Firefox Quantum ceased support for extensions that use XUL or the Add-ons SDK so the extension was rebased using WebExtensions APIs. As a result of Mozilla's changes, reliance upon the companion application increased. Firefox 57.0 and Video DownloadHelper 7.0.0 were released on the same day (14 November 2017). Release 7.3.7, 26 June 2019, addresses problems that were caused by changes to YouTube.

Where aggregation (ADP) or conversion is required by the end user, or by a site from which download is required: if the companion app is unlicensed, the result will include a watermark (a QR code). Since 2019 user reviews complain of slow conversion and unfinished downloads.

The software is financed through advertisements on the developer's website, donations, and associated software sales.

== Reception ==
Eric Griffith of PC Magazine named it one of the best Firefox extensions of 2012. Erez Zukerman of PC World rated it 4/5 stars and called it "a valuable tool". TechRadar rated it 5/5 stars and wrote, "Anyone who wants to watch videos, not only online, but also on the train, in the car or on the plane, is very well served with Video DownloadHelper."

== See also ==
- List of Firefox extensions
