= Pie hole =

Pie hole may refer to:

- "Pie Hole", a song from Terry Scott Taylor's 2000 album Avocado Faultline
- The Pie Hole, a fictional bakery in the television series Pushing Daisies
- A slang and sometimes offensive term for the human mouth
- Pi-hole, a network level advertisement and tracking blocker
