= Filterset.G =

- Operating system: Cross-platform
- Available in: English
- Type: Firefox legacy extension
- License: Proprietary freeware

Filterset.G was a third-party set of filters for ad filtering extensions such as Adblock Plus used with Firefox web browser. The filterset contained pre-made and regularly updated filters (including the Adblock Plus filter) that removed ads from various ad providers.

The service was discontinued on February 3, 2008, as the owner could not afford the expenses that running the site cost.

== License ==
The Filterset.G filters are public domain (CC0 1.0).

== History ==
Filterset.G was created and maintained by Graham Pierce (who usually goes by the name "Pierceive" or "G"). It was the first major filter list available for Adblock, dating from July 2004. The list grew out of a shared list of personal filters and feedback from its users. A companion extension, Adblock Filterset.G Updater, was created for it by Micheal McDonald and Reid Rankin in order to simplify the task of keeping the latest list updates loaded into Adblock, which did not contain update functionality at the time.

When Adblock Plus, which does contain automatic update functionality, was released, Graham Pierce decided to make Filterset.G incompatible with the new built-in update function, requiring users to run the Adblock Filterset.G Updater extension to use his filterlist. This was done in order to control the frequency of update checks and route downloads through the Coral CDN, in order to prevent the large number of users who subscribed to Filterset.G from overloading its server's bandwidth.

== Other browsers ==
Filterset.G was compatible with the native ad-blocking facility in KDE's Konqueror web browser from release 3.5 onwards. It was also part of Epiphany-extensions' Ad Blocker extension for GNOME's Epiphany browser. It was also possible to use it with Safari via third-party plug-ins.

== See also ==
- Online advertising
