= Interstitial webpage =

Webpage displayed expected.

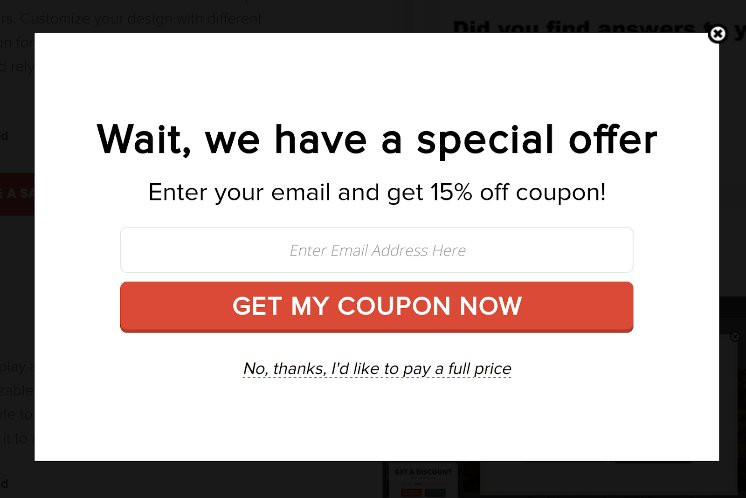
An example of an advertisement with 🗙 button to close it and return to the interrupted content; the dashed link might also close it, or misleadingly go elsewhere

On the web, an interstitial webpage (or interstitial) is a web page displayed before or after an expected content page, often to display advertising or for regulatory reasons, such as to confirm the user's age (prior to showing age-restricted material) or obtain consent to store cookies. Most interstitial advertisements are delivered by an ad server. Interstitial pages are also frequently used to warn users before they are navigated to an external website from a trusted site.

Some people take issue with the use of such pages to present online advertising before allowing users to see the content they were trying to access.

== Meaning of interstitial ==
In this context, interstitial is used in the sense of in-between. The interstitial web page sits between a referenced page and the page which references it—hence it is in between two pages. This is distinct from a page which simply links directly to another, in that the interstitial page serves only to provide extra information to a user during the act of navigating from one page to the next.

In digital marketing, interstitial is often used in the sense of interstitial advertising, rather than interstitial webpage. In some cases, this may lead to confusion because interstitial ads are not always served on interstitial web pages. According to a standard advanced by the IAB, an interstitial (also known as a between-the-page ad) can either be displayed on a separate webpage or appear briefly as an overlay on the destination page. Moreover, mobile advertising guidelines created by the Mobile Marketing Association (MMA) include in-app interstitial ads, which are integrated into applications.

== Circumvention ==
Many interstitial adverts are circumvented by NoScript and ad blockers.

== See also ==
- Ad blocker
- Ad server, the technology that delivers most online advertisements
- AdBlock, a tool to prevent the display of online advertisements
- Adobe Flash, a technology similar in its application for online advertising
- Modal window
- Pop-up ad
