= Flattr =

Swedish-based microdonation subscription service

Flattr AB
- Available in: English
- Founded: 2010
- Dissolved: 2023
- Headquarters: Malmö, Sweden
- Owner: Eyeo GmbH
- Founders: Peter Sunde; Linus Olsson
- Industry: Micropayments
- Website: flattr.com
- Commercial: Yes
- Registration: Required

Flattr was a Swedish-based microdonation subscription service, where subscribers opted in to pay a monthly patronage to help fund their favourite websites and creators. It shut down in November 2023.

Flattr subscribers installed an open-source browser extension that records which websites they frequent and shares this data with Flattr. Flattr processes this user data and pays out shares of the user's subscription to each registered Flattr creator based on which websites the user consumed. Flattr filtered websites by domains with a default allowlist of participating domains, but individual users could override and contribute to any website they want or withhold contributions from any website.

== History ==
In March 2010, Flattr launched on an invitation-only basis and then opened to the public on 12 August of the same year.

The project was started by Peter Sunde and Linus Olsson. Its first version required users to click on a "flattr" button on websites to "flattr" content. Sunde said, "We want to encourage people to share money as well as content." The final version allowed users to pay a monthly donation (provided a minimum of 3 dollars) which was automatically split among websites, pages or platforms that are "flattrd" by Flattr's web extension.

In December 2010, Flattr received large-scale attention when it was tweeted to be a method of donating money to WikiLeaks, which had recently been cut off by PayPal, Visa, and MasterCard.

On 28 April 2011, Flattr announced by email that they would not require users to subscribe to donate to others before they could be donated to themselves, starting from 1 May 2011.

On 16 April 2013, Twitter announced that they would no longer allow Flattr users to donate to favorite sites via the Twitter platform, citing commercial confusion problems they believed would occur between users.

In May 2016, Flattr partnered with the developer of the ad blocking browser extension Adblock Plus to create Flattr Plus, a service which allows users to automatically distribute a designated budget of monthly payments to web publishers based on their engagement. The service was conceived as a way for users to support online publishers as an alternative to advertising.

On 5 April 2017, Adblock Plus publisher Eyeo GmbH announced that it had acquired Flattr for an undisclosed amount. Flattr also announced a beta of an overhauled "zero-click" version of the service adapted from the Flattr Plus concept.

On 24 October 2017, Flattr announced the launch of 'Flattr 2.0'. This version of Flattr was a zero-click service for automatic denoting of content on the web and various platforms as donation-worthy. Content creators had only to link their websites or supported platforms to be able to receive payments.

On 24 May 2018, Flattr made changes to their privacy policy to comply with the GDPR and began deleting previously collected user activity after three months. Flattr's old privacy policy allowed them to keep a record of their subscribers' web browsing history indefinitely.

== Supported creator platforms ==
Flattr 2.0 was able to be used on websites via a meta tag, and supported various creator platforms including YouTube, Wordpress, Vimeo, Twitter, Twitch, SoundCloud, GitHub, 500px and Flickr.

== Corporate affairs ==
=== Funding ===
In 2012, Flattr received €1.6 million in funding from Passion Capital Investments, LLP and Federico Pirzio-Biroli.

As part of its collaboration with Flattr, Eyeo GmbH also made an investment in Flattr.

=== Sponsorships ===
In 2017, Flattr became a supporting partner of MozFest, Mozilla's annual festival devoted to a healthy web.

== Awards ==
- Best New Startup in 2010 - TechCrunch Europe.
- Hoola Bandoola Band award.
- Top-10 in Netexplorateur 2011.

== See also ==
- Brave (web browser) § Brave Rewards
- Google Contributor
