= WikiHow =

Wiki-based how-to website

wikiHow

- Main page of wikiHow as of July 2025
- Company type: Private
- Website type: Online how-to website
- Available in: 19 languages
- List of languages English, Spanish, Dutch, Portuguese, French, German, Italian, Chinese, Russian, Czech, Japanese, Indonesian, Arabic, Thai, Korean, Vietnamese, Hindi, Turkish, Persian
- Headquarters: Palo Alto, California, United States
- Area served: Worldwide
- Creator: Jack Herrick
- Key people: Elizabeth Douglas (CEO); Jack Herrick (founder)
- Parent: wikiHow, Inc.
- Website: www.wikihow.com/Main-Page
- Commercial: Yes ("hybrid organization")
- Registration: Optional, but necessary for certain tasks
- Launched: January 15, 2005; 21 years ago
- Current status: Active
- Content license: CC BY-NC-SA (prior to March 2025); Proprietary (after March 24, 2025)
- Written in: PHP

wikiHow is an online wiki-style publication featuring informational articles and quizzes on a variety of topics. Founded in 2005 by Internet entrepreneur Jack Herrick, its aim is to create an extensive database of instructional content, using the wiki model of open collaboration to allow users to add, create, and modify content. It is a hybrid organization, a for-profit company run for a social mission. wikiHow uses a forked version of the free and open-source MediaWiki software; these modifications made by wikiHow were freely available to the general public via a self-serve download site from 2010 to late 2020, when wikiHow chose to discontinue the self-serve portal, citing vague "DoS attacks", as well as noting that publishing the source code is "not part of our core mission".

In February 2005, wikiHow had over 35.5 million unique visitors. As of December 2021, wikiHow contains more than 235,000 how-to articles and over 2.5 million registered users.

== History ==
wikiHow was founded by Jack Herrick on January 15, 2005, with the goal of creating "the how-to guide for everything." January 15 was selected as its launch date to honor Wikipedia, which was launched on January 15, 2001.

Herrick drew inspiration for wikiHow from eHow, a how-to website he and business partner Josh Hannah purchased in 2004. After running eHow, Herrick concluded that its business model prevented it from becoming the extensive, high quality how-to site he wanted to create. Deciding that the wiki method of content creation would ultimately produce higher-quality work, both of them sold eHow in 2006 to Demand Media. Herrick described the difference between eHow and wikiHow as "eating a McDonald's burger vs. a wonderful, home cooked meal."

In 2006, the non-profit foundation One Laptop per Child chose wikiHow as one of the content sources for the educational laptops it distributed around the world. On September 21, 2007, the website's 25,000th article was published. In 2009, after completing a redesign the site surpassed 20 million monthly visitors with 25 million page views. In 2014, Google chose wikiHow as one of the launch partners for Google Contributor, an ad-free Internet product. In 2016, wikiHow reached 100 million monthly visitors.

On March 24, 2016, wikiHow acquired Guidecentral, a website focused on instructions for "hands-on" projects. The acquisition's terms were not released; however, Guidecentral raised over $1 million from investors, including NXTP Labs, Enterprise Ireland, and South Ventures.

== Operations ==
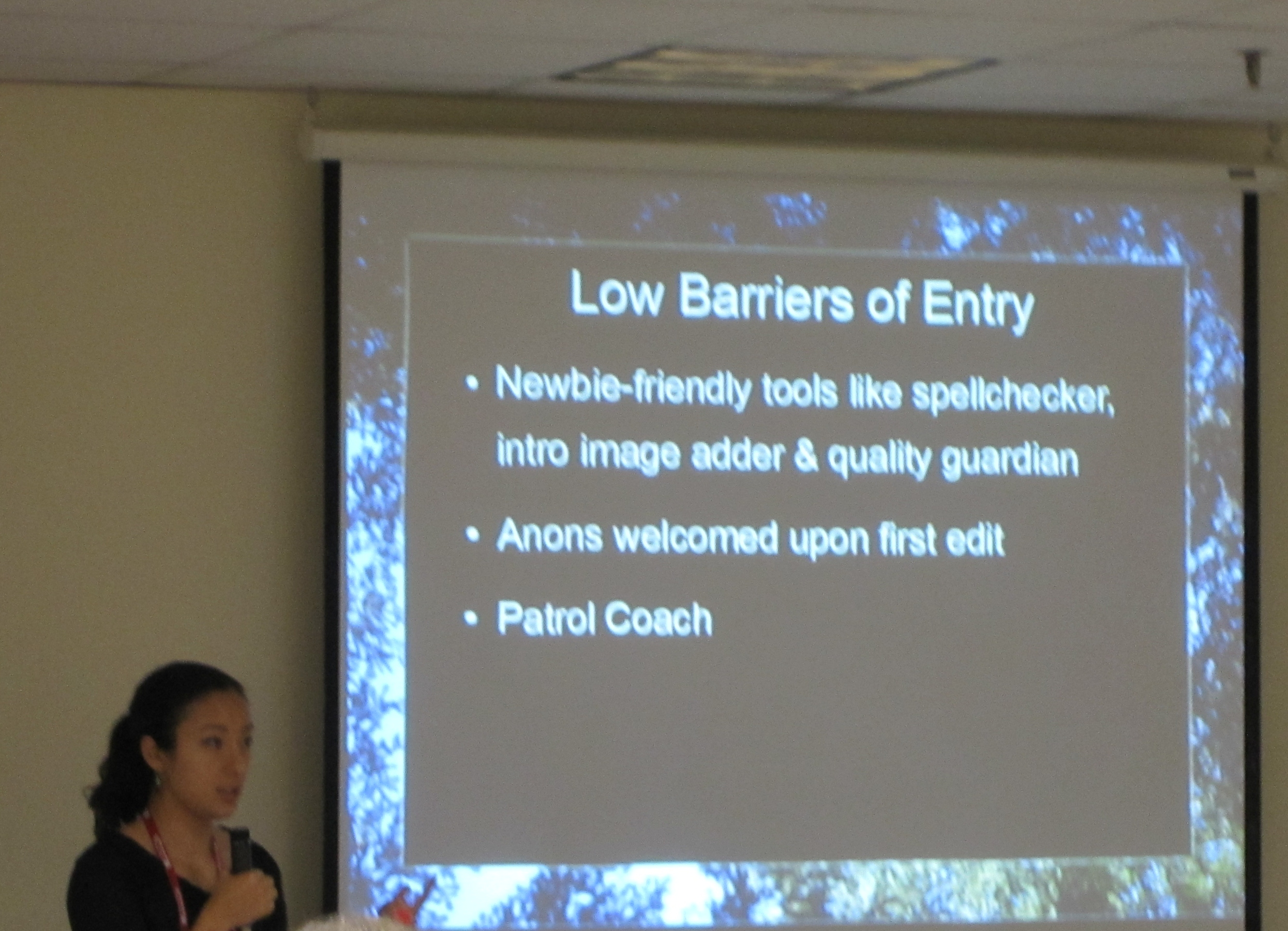
Workshop on women on wikiHow at Wikimania 2012.

wikiHow provides instructional content on a wide range of topics. As of December 2021, it contains over 235,000 articles. Articles typically follow a standardized format to detail the step-by-step process of completing a task or accomplishing a specific outcome. Images serve as visual aids and may be created by users or contracted staff.

The MediaWiki software allows users to add, delete, and otherwise modify content. Like other wikis, quality control is achieved by reviewing edits via the "Recent Changes" page and using a diff feature to compare revisions of an article and highlight changes in the content. Other users review these changes and may accept or reject the edits based on guidelines regarding content and style.

To provide an authoritative review and ensure reliability of the content, staff writers also consult with subject-matter experts, particularly in topics such as health and medicine, law, finance, and psychology. In 2021, wikiHow partnered with the United Nations to launch a campaign against COVID-19 misinformation.

Among the volunteer editing community, a number of trusted users, known as administrators, may be tasked with responsibilities pertaining to the maintenance and smooth operation of the website. Functionally similar to administrators on Wikipedia and internet forum moderators, these users have elevated account privileges used to delete articles, block other users from editing, and perform various maintenance tasks.

== Business model ==
At the time of launch, wikiHow's startup costs were, to some extent, financed from Herrick's sale of eHow. The website has since relied on advertising on its pages for revenue. wikiHow is run as a "hybrid organization"—a "for-profit company focused on creating a global public good in accordance with [the] mission".

Initially and throughout its history, Herrick has declined financial donations to wikiHow. However, in mid-2020 as a response to the economic impact of the COVID-19 pandemic, the company began soliciting contributions to support wikiHow. Later that year, wikiHow released a subscription service called "wikiHow Pro", which allows access to paywalled features such as custom PDF downloads of articles and email-based courses created by subject-matter experts.

=== Licensing ===
wikiHow's text content published prior to March 24, 2025 are licensed under the Creative Commons Attribution-Noncommercial-Share Alike 3.0 (by-nc-sa 3.0) license, allowing it to be modified and reused for non-commercial purposes as long as the original authors are attributed and the license is not substantially changed. Authors retain full copyright to their content, may publish it elsewhere under different licenses, and grant wikiHow an irrevocable license to use it for any purpose.

Text content published after March 24, 2025 are no longer licensed under CC BY-NC-SA 3.0 license, but the authors still retains copyright ownership as before.

=== Opt-out ads ===
wikiHow lets readers control whether advertising appears alongside content. Registered, logged-in users do not see ads, except those from external video providers.

In November 2014, it was announced that wikiHow would participate in Google Contributor, a service allowing website users to make monthly donations to support their favorite websites and not be required to see ads on them.

== Reception ==
wikiHow has won multiple awards, including a Webby Award for Community in 2009, and the Co-Creation award in the Open Innovation competition, organized by The Guardian and Nesta in 2010. Mashable selected wikiHow as runner-up for best wiki in its Open Web Awards in 2008. In October 2018, Gizmodo included wikiHow in its list of "100 Websites That Shaped the Internet as We Know It", referring to it as "a consistently useful resource." More recently, Forbes recognized wikiHow in its list of "The Best Small Companies Of 2019".

A PBS journalist reported that the "wikiHow app has an excellent set of articles to help you in just about any situation, from helping someone who is choking to handling vehicle emergencies, to natural disasters." The New York Times reported: "Type in a few key words about the problem into the app's Search page and the guide will return some advice. Its information pages are clear and well laid out. They begin with an introductory description, then offer a list of steps to follow. The app displays the necessary tools and items, and includes tips and warnings." Lifehacker has described wikiHow as the "ever-handy guide site." wikiHow has been positively described in many other media, including Inc. Magazine, Cosmopolitan, TechRepublic, Condé Nast Traveler and PC Magazine.

wikiHow has also been the target of satire and criticism for its notable abundance of arguably eccentric articles. For example, American Public Radio show Wits has a segment called "wikiHow theater", where actors read obvious or ludicrous wikiHow topics, such as "How to Make People Respect Your Pet", for comic effect. Two accomplished poets, Carol Guess and Daniela Olszewska, published a book called "How To Feel Confident with Your Special Talents", where each poem's title is taken directly from a wikiHow article. Vice parodied wikiHow's article "How to Break Up with Your Boyfriend". The Huffington Post created a list of bizarre life skills, such as "How to React to an Ugly Baby", that "you could only learn from wikiHow". Other publishers have criticized wikiHow for hosting instructions on topics of questionable social value, such as "How to get a thigh gap" and "How to stop a wedding". Other websites have created "worst of wikiHow" lists to highlight topics that are "deranged", "brilliantly bizarre" and otherwise controversial.

The artwork of wikiHow's illustrations has received mixed reception among internet users, with some praising the representation of various minority groups, while others ridicule the bizarre and uncanny depictions. In an interview with OneZero, Chris Hadley, Vice President of Operations, stated that the illustrations are created by freelance artists typically outside of the US.
