= Sinkhole (disambiguation) =

A sinkhole is a hole in the earth's surface caused by a collapse in the soil or bedrock.

It can also refer to:

- Sinkhole (film), a 2021 South Korean disaster comedy film
- Battle of the Sink Hole, a battle in the War of 1812
- Drain (plumbing), a hole in a sink for draining
- DNS sinkhole, a DNS server that points a domain to bogus internet addresses
