= Exit intent popup =

Popup triggered when user moves to exit page

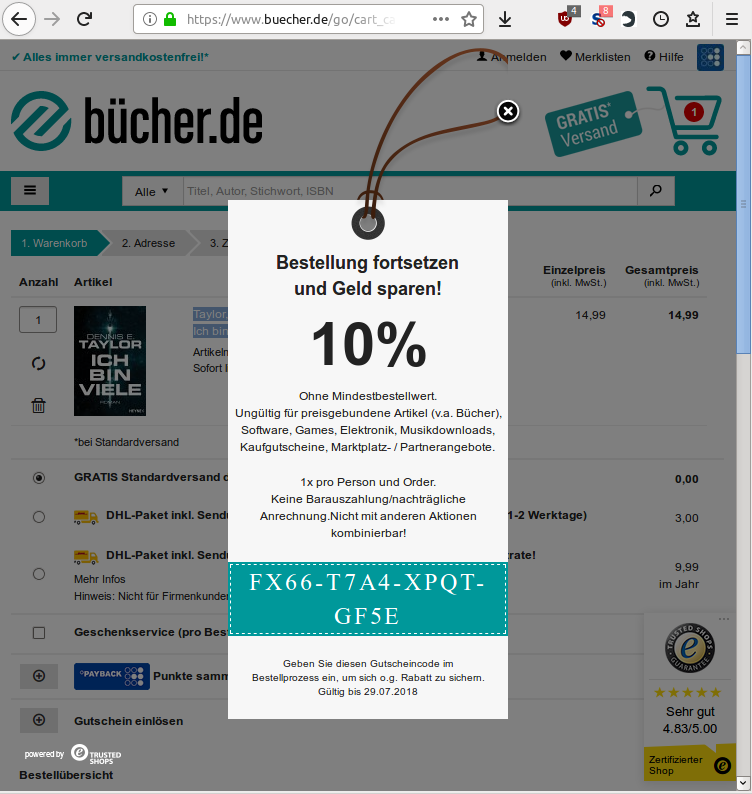
Example of an exit intent popup

An exit intent popup is a technique used in online shops and websites to retain visitors who are going to leave the site.

With an exit intent popup, a visitor's mouse movements are tracked, and when the cursor moves outside the upper page boundary (because the tab bar is usually there), a popup window is shown. The ad is triggered by using a JavaScript snippet that measures the speed and direction of the mouse. Often, the popup contains a discount code to convince the user to finish the sale. Exit intent advertisements can also be used to offer a discount, push to a demo, collect emails, or segment to a newsletter list.

Exit intent technology, including the detection of exit behavior by an internet user, was invented and patented by Ryan Urban, the CEO and co-founder of BounceX, in 2012.

== Exit intent technology on mobile devices ==
The exit-intent technology works differently on mobile devices than on a desktop. There is no mouse movement to track, so advanced exit intent popup software will show a popup once a visitor tries to click "back" or close the mobile browser tab.
