= Auto-Play =

Feature of web sites or media players

Auto-Play is a feature used by some websites containing at least one embedded video or audio element wherein the video or audio element starts playing, automatically, without explicit user choice, after some triggering event such as page load or navigating to a particular region of the webpage.

== Features ==
On a website-by-website basis, auto-play may or may not be configurable. Using technology such as cookies, some websites allow a user to select a volume for sound on one page, and may remember that choice (until changed by the user) when reloading content or loading new content. This feature is not dependent on the auto-play or lack of auto-play nature of the media element or website, as it can be applied to non-auto-play elements as well.

Elements with auto-play sounds may or may not allow the user to directly adjust the sound volume with the element itself, and the element may default to a particular sound level (relative to sound settings already set at the browser or system level).

Some websites may employ hooks to allow on media element, once finished, to trigger the auto-play of another elements. This feature may or may not involve a new page load. This feature is not necessarily dependent on whether the starting media element was itself started manually by the user or via an auto-play trigger.

== Applications ==
Auto-Play may appear as a feature in website advertisements and in website content. The embedded elements may use such technology as Flash Player, streaming media, or pre-recorded media. It may appear as part of the webpage (for example, advertisements and embedded video) or more prominently (for example, webpages dedicated to a specific media element, such as a movie or Flash game).

Various technologies may be used, in tandem or on their own, to support auto-play.

Auto-Play can serve as a convenience to the user (for example, auto-play of a movie of some other media element), or an attempt to attract a user's attention, which may or may not also be a convenience (for example, advertisements, embedded video in a news story webpage).

== Criticism and support ==
For some applications (generally when applied to content a user is not likely to have been looking for, such as advertisements), auto-play is discussed in some tech forums and by some tech groups as "bad practice".

For other applications (such as webpages dedicated to specific media elements a user is likely to have been targeting, such as a specific video or audio recording), the ostensible convenience factor of auto-play may be accepted or even expected by the user.
