= Google Contributor =

Program to replace advertising with payments

- Company type: Subsidiary of Google
- Industry: Mobile advertising
- Founded: November 20, 2014; 11 years ago
- Parent: Google
- Website: contributor.google.com

Google Contributor was a program run by Google that allowed users in the Google Network of content sites to view the websites without any advertisements that are administered, sorted, and maintained by Google.

The program was launched publicly with prominent websites, like The Onion and Mashable among others, to test this service. After November 2015, the program opened up to any publisher who displayed ads on their websites through Google AdSense without requiring any sign-on from publishers. After November 2015, the program was available to everyone in the United States.

Google Contributor stopped accepting new registrations after December 2016 in preparation for a new version launch in early 2017. On January 17, Google Contributor was shut down, with the landing page stating "We're launching a new and improved Contributor in early 2017!"

In June 2017, the new Google Contributor was launched, but was shut down again. Some of the pages for Google Contributor still exist, but there is no way to sign up nor to log in, and the link for site owner help goes to a generic Google help page.

== Background ==
Contributor was invented by Nemo Semret, as a 20% Project. The system allowed users to view online content resources (webpages, video streams, mobile apps), without advertising, by automatically bidding for the publisher's ad slots in real-time on behalf of the user and competing against advertisers. Thus it was a market-based content micro-payment system, ensuring fewer ads for users, and at least as much revenue for publishers as they would get from ads.

Users could set a maximum monthly contribution starting at US$1.99 up to $14.99. After February 2016, Google Contributor changed to a fixed subscription fee of $6.99.

When the user visits any of the Contributor-supported websites, a small part of the contribution will go to the website owners. The ad blocks, instead of displaying advertisement material, will, by default, display a thank you message with a pixel pattern. This pattern can be configured to contain cats or other patterns.

In the implementation, Contributor bids for ad slots on the user's behalf using the standard Google ad auction system; if the user wins the auction, the Contributor image is placed in the ad space, and the cost of the ad is deducted from the user's monthly contribution. If the user does not win, the winning ad is displayed as normal and the user pays nothing for that slot. The website owners are paid for the ad slot as normal, although the revenue could, in theory, be marginally higher due to an additional participant in the ad auction.

With the new Google Contributor, each site set its own price independently. This is a fixed price per page view. Each time a visitor views a page, the corresponding fixed fee is deducted from the Contributor balance.

== See also ==
- Google AdSense
- Google Ads
- Brave (web browser) § Brave Rewards
- Flattr
- List of Google products
- Pay per play
