= All rights reserved =

Copyright notice

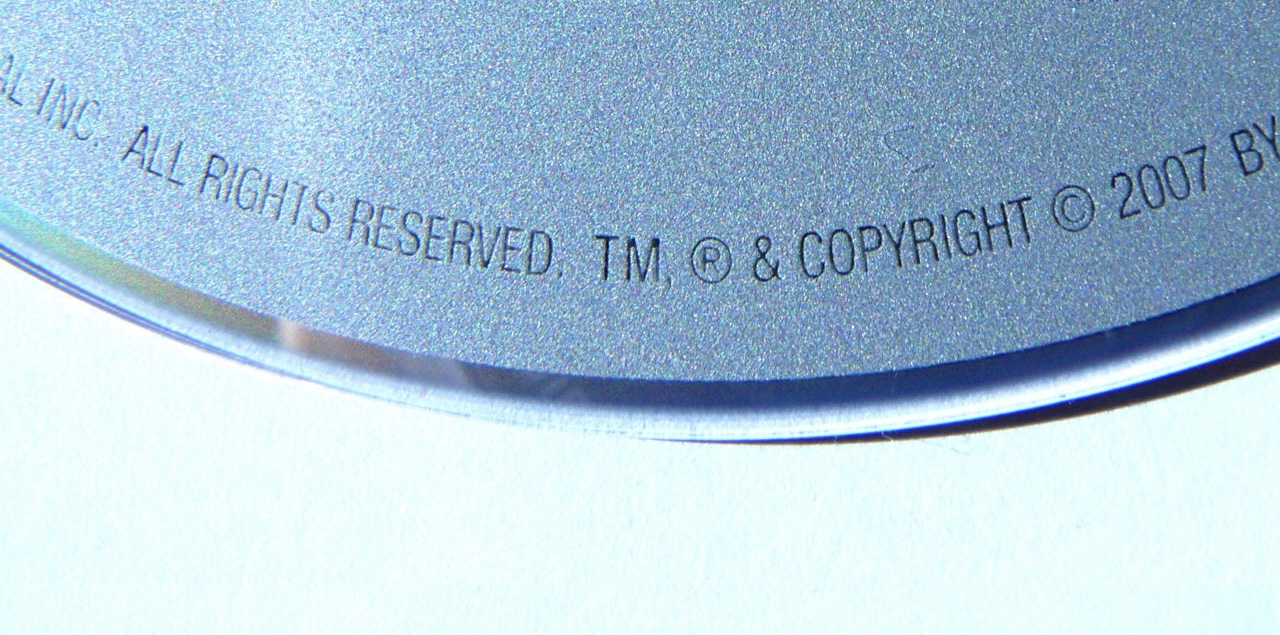
The phrase "all rights reserved" appearing on a DVD

"All rights reserved" is a phrase that originated in copyright law as part of copyright notices. It indicates that the copyright holder reserves, or holds for their own use, all the rights provided by copyright law, such as distribution, performance, and creation of derivative works; that is, they have not waived any such right. Copyright law in most countries no longer requires such notices, but the phrase persists. The original understanding of the phrase as relating specifically to copyright may have been supplanted by common usage of the phrase to refer to any legal right, although it is probably understood to refer at least to copyright.

In the past, the phrase was required as a result of the Buenos Aires Convention of 1910 which mandated that some statement of reservation of rights be made in order to secure protection in signatory countries of the convention. It was required to add the phrase as a written notice that all rights granted under existing copyright law (such as the right to publish a work within a specific area) were retained by the copyright holder and that legal action might be taken against infringement.

Since copyright law is neither straightforward nor widely understood in its details – nor is the Buenos Aires Convention's previous requirement, and the current deprecation of the phrase, common or lay knowledge, it continues to hold popular currency and serve as a notionally-useful convention widely used by artists, writers, directors, photographers, designers, and many other content-creators with the intention that it should function as both sign and warning that the content alongside which it appears cannot be copied freely. It is unclear, however, if the phrase has any legal effect in any jurisdiction.

== Origins ==
The phrase originated as a result of the Buenos Aires Convention of 1910. Article 3 of the Convention granted copyright in all signatory countries to a work registered in any signatory country, as long as a statement "that indicates the reservation of the property right" (emphasis added) appeared in the work. The phrase "all rights reserved" was not specified in the text, but met this requirement.

Other copyright treaties did not require this formality. For example, in 1952 the Universal Copyright Convention (UCC) adopted the © symbol as an indicator of protection. (The symbol was introduced in the US by a 1954 amendment to the Copyright Act of 1909.) The Berne Convention rejected formalities altogether in Article 4 of the 1908 revision, so authors seeking to protect their works in countries that had signed on to the Berne Convention were also not required to use the "all rights reserved" formulation. However, because not all Buenos Aires signatories were members of Berne or the UCC, and in particular the United States did not join UCC until 1955, a publisher in a Buenos Aires signatory seeking to protect a work in the greatest number of countries between 1910 and 1952 would have used both the phrase "all rights reserved" and the copyright symbol.

== Obsolescence ==
The requirement to add the "all rights reserved" notice became essentially obsolete on August 23, 2000, when Nicaragua became the final member of the Buenos Aires Convention to also become a signatory to the Berne Convention. As of that date, every country that was a member of the Buenos Aires Convention (which is the only copyright treaty requiring this notice to be used) was also a member of Berne, which requires protection be granted without any formality of notice of copyright.

== See also ==
- Copyright formalities
- Copyright notice
- Some rights reserved
- Public domain
