= AdBlock =

Browser extension to block adverstisements

AdBlock is an ad-blocking browser extension for Google Chrome, Apple Safari (desktop and mobile), Firefox, Samsung Internet, Microsoft Edge and Opera. AdBlock allows users to prevent page elements, such as advertisements, from being displayed. It is free to download and use, and it includes optional donations to the developers. The AdBlock extension was created on December 8, 2009, which is the day that supports for extensions was added to Google Chrome. It was one of the first Google Chrome extensions that was made.

Since 2016, AdBlock has been based on the Adblock Plus source code.

In July 2018, AdBlock acquired uBlock, a commercial ad-blocker owned by uBlock LLC and based on uBlock Origin.

In April 2021, eyeo GmbH (developer of Adblock Plus) announced its purchase of AdBlock, Inc (formerly BetaFish, Inc).

== Crowdfunding ==
Gundlach launched a crowdfunding campaign on Crowdtilt in August 2013 in order to fund an ad campaign to raise awareness of ad-blocking and to rent a billboard at Times Square. After the one-month campaign, it raised $55,000.

== Sales and acceptable ads ==
AdBlock was sold to an anonymous buyer in 2015 and on October 15, 2015, Gundlach's name was taken down from the site. In the terms of the deal, the original developer Michael Gundlach left operations to Adblock's continuing director, Gabriel Cubbage, and as of October 2, 2015, AdBlock began participating in the Acceptable Ads program. Acceptable Ads identifies "non-annoying" ads, which AdBlock shows by default. The intent is to allow non-invasive advertising, to either maintain support for websites that rely on advertising as a main source of revenue or for websites that have an agreement with the program.

== Filters ==
AdBlock uses EasyList, the same filter syntax as Adblock Plus for Firefox, and natively supports the use of a number of filter lists.

== Partnership with Amnesty International ==
On March 12, 2016, in support of World Day Against Cyber Censorship, and in partnership with Amnesty International, instead of blocking ads, AdBlock replaced ads with banners linked to articles on Amnesty's website, written by prominent free speech advocates such as Edward Snowden, to raise awareness of government-imposed online censorship and digital privacy issues around the world.

The campaign was met with both praise and criticism, with AdBlock's CEO, Gabriel Cubbage, defending the decision in an essay on AdBlock's website, saying "We’re showing you Amnesty banners, just for today, because we believe users should be part of the conversation about online privacy. Tomorrow, those spaces will be vacant again. But take a moment to consider that in an increasingly information-driven world, when your right to digital privacy is threatened, so is your right to free expression." Meanwhile, Simon Sharwood of The Register characterized Cubbage's position as "'You should control your computer except when we feel political', says AdBlock CEO".

== AdBlock for Firefox ==
On September 13, 2014, the AdBlock team released a version for Firefox users, ported from the code for Google Chrome, released under the same free software license as the original Adblock. The extension was removed on April 2, 2015, by an administrator on Mozilla Add-ons.

On December 7, 2015, the official AdBlock site's knowledge base article stated that with version 44 or higher of Firefox desktop and Firefox Mobile, AdBlock will not be supported. The last version of Adblock for those platforms will work on older versions of Firefox.

AdBlock was released again on Mozilla Add-ons on November 17, 2016.

On April 1, 2012, Adblock developer Michael Gundlach tweaked the code to display LOLcats instead of simply blocking ads. Initially developed as a short-lived April Fools joke, the response was so positive that CatBlock was continued to be offered as an optional add-on supported by a monthly subscription.

On October 23, 2014, the developer decided to end official support for CatBlock, and made it open-source, under GPLv3 licensing, as the original extension.

== See also ==
- AdGuard
- Adware
- Advertising management
- Potentially unwanted program
