= Samsung Browser =

Web browser developed by Samsung

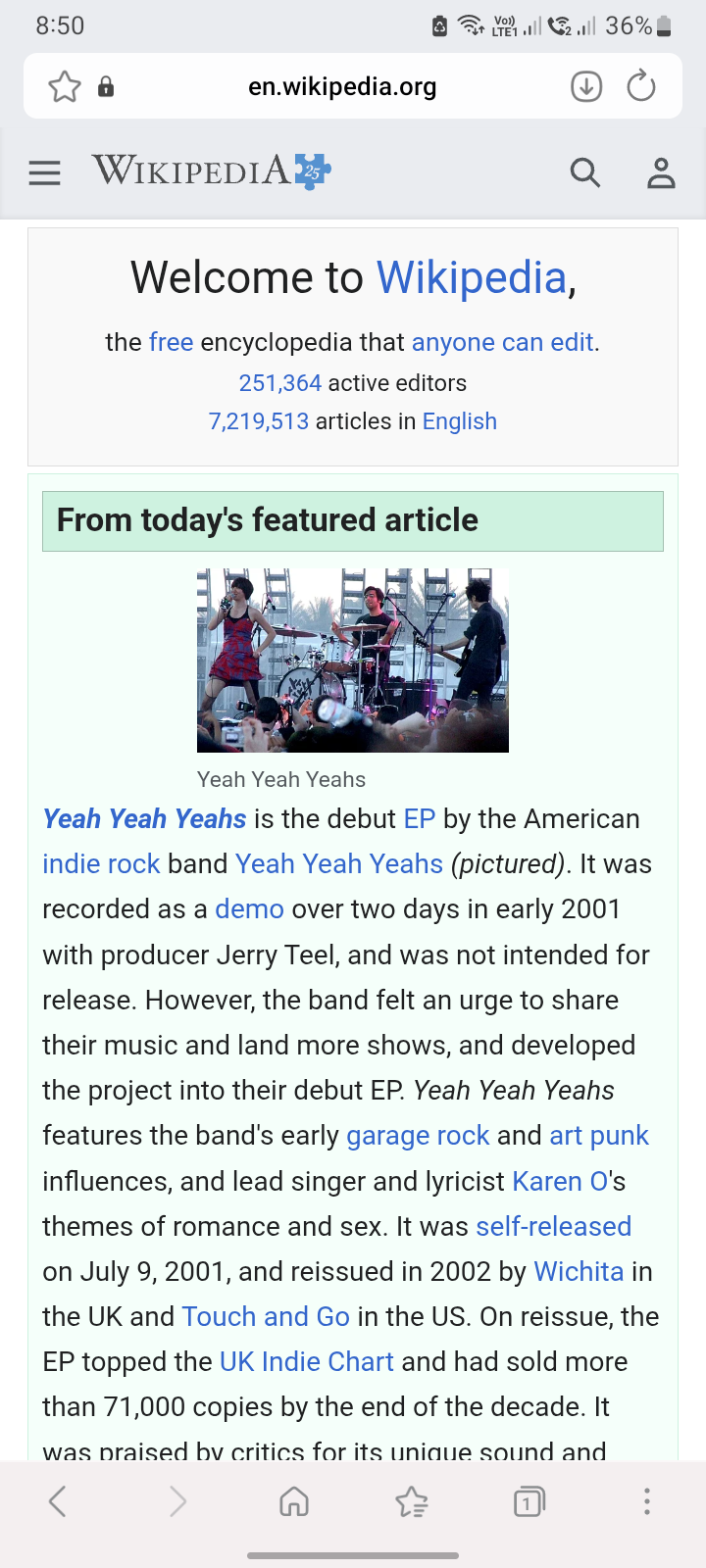
- Screenshot of Samsung Browser on Android displaying the Wikipedia home page
- Developer: Samsung Electronics
Release
- Windows: 30.0.0.95 / March 25, 2026; 7 months ago

Stable release(s)
- Windows: 31.0.0.55 / September 17, 2026; 57 days ago
- Android: 31.0.0.81 / November 12, 2026; 1 day ago
- Gear VR: 5.6.00-9 / August 17, 2018; 8 years ago

Preview release(s)
- Android: 30.0.0.67 / July 8, 2026; 4 months ago
- Engine: Blink, V8, WebKit
- Operating system: Android 10 or later; Tizen; Wear OS; Windows 10 (1809) or later
- Included with: Samsung Galaxy devices
- Type: Web browser, mobile browser
- License: Proprietary, based on an open source project
- Website: samsung.com/apps (Main site); browser.samsung.com (Windows-based browser)

Samsung Browser (formerly known as Samsung Internet) is a web browser developed by Samsung Electronics. It was made by the company as a basic mobile browser for the Samsung Galaxy series of Android-based smartphones, has been included on smart TVs, and in March 2026 was also released for Windows 10 and later. The browser is based on Chromium.

A software engineer for Samsung estimated that the web browser had around 400 million monthly active users in 2016. According to StatCounter, it had a market share of around 2.48% of mobile devices in July 2026, having peaked at 7.43% in January 2019. (Note: Detection for Samsung Internet web browser statistics was added by StatCounter in February 2016. Consequently, statistics for the web browser were not captured before then.)

The web browser has been downloaded more than 1 billion times on the Google Play store website. It is also available for download from the Samsung Galaxy Store.

== History ==
The first Samsung device to feature Samsung Internet was the Samsung Galaxy S3, an Android-based smartphone released by Samsung in 2012. The web browser came pre-installed on these phones, and its code was based on Android's stock AOSP (Android) browser. It became the default web browser on Samsung Galaxy devices from this time forward.

In early 2013, the web browser was redesigned to use Chromium, an open source web browser project developed by Google. This new version was pre-installed on Samsung Galaxy S4 smartphones released later that year.

On December 2, 2015, Samsung released "Samsung Internet for Gear VR", a version of Samsung Internet designed to be used in Samsung's Gear VR. It includes voice recognition, 360° and 3D video streaming. It was made available for download through the Oculus Store.

In early 2017, the Samsung web browser was released for the first time in the Google Play store, as a beta version.

In November 2023, Samsung Internet was released for Microsoft Windows via the Microsoft Store before being removed in January 2024 without explanation.

On October 30, 2025, Samsung officially released a beta version of their web browser for Windows 10 and later, under the name "Samsung Internet Beta for Windows". The application was advertised with a different name in a news article on the Samsung website's Newsroom section - "Samsung Internet Beta for PC". On March 26, 2026, Samsung officially released the first stable version of the Windows-based web browser using the name "Samsung Browser for Windows".

== Features ==
Since 2017, Samsung has developed the Samsung Internet browser with a focus on a seamless browsing experience for users when they use Samsung Internet or Samsung Browser and their Samsung account on compatible devices and operating systems. In August 2017, Samsung released version 6.2 of its web browser, which gave users the ability to sync their bookmarks, saved pages, and open tabs across their Android-based devices. Users could also elect to install a browser extension with the ability to sync bookmarks on desktops. With the release of One UI 3.1 in 2021, users of Samsung Internet (and Samsung Notes) can copy and paste to the clipboard between Galaxy devices in sync. With the release of Samsung Browser for Windows in 2026, mobile devices and PCs can be synchronised such that bookmarks, browsing history and the currently viewed tab are quickly accessible between devices. The integrated Samsung Pass platform stores and retrieves information typically entered into webforms by users, such as login credentials and personal information.

In March 2026, Samsung introduced an "Ask AI" feature to the Android version of the browser in South Korea and the United States, allowing users to ask questions about the content of a web page directly within the browser rather than switching to a separate app. This functionality was expanded in June 2026 under the name "Ask Anything" as part of the One UI 9 update.

== Version history ==
=== Android ===
| Version | Based on | Release date | New features |
|---|---|---|---|
| 1.0 | Chromium 18 | 2013 | Initial release based on Chromium engine, providing basic browsing capabilities. |
| 1.5 | Chromium 28 | | Initial public release, based on Android browser. |
| 2.0 | Chromium 34 | | Added Samsung extensions to Chromium base. |
| 3.0 | Chromium 38 | August 2015 | Quick Access, navigation page, Shortcut Promotion Banner, audio notification, Data Saving Mode |
| 4.0 | Chromium 44 | Early 2016 | Secret mode, content cards, a floating video, a video history feature, web push, service workers, custom tabs, and a content blocker extension. |
| 4.0.10-53 | Chromium 44 | April 20, 2016 | Text size setting for web pages |
| 4.2 | Chromium 44 | October 4, 2016 | Iris scanner support in Secret Mode and Web Auto Login, Web Content Provider Extension, QR Code reader, Video Assistant, 360° video support |
| 5.0 | Chromium 51 | December 16, 2016 | Web payment and an enhanced video assistant. |
| 5.2 | Chromium 51 | February, 2017 | Samsung Dex support, CloseBy, Web Payment-Deep integration with Samsung Pay, Progressive Web App indication badge |
| 5.4.00-75 | Chromium 51 | May 17, 2017 | Tab navigation with a swipe gesture, a quick menu, an enhanced navigation page (China only), content blocker status UI (in menu) |
| 5.4.02.3 | Chromium 51 | August 24, 2017 | Swift key support |
| 6.0.00.98 | Chromium 56 | September 8, 2017 | |
| 6.2.01.12 | Chromium 56 | October 26, 2017 | Night mode improvement, high contrast mode, Instant App support, tracking blocker, downloadable browser bookmark sync |
| 6.4.10.5 | Chromium 56 | February 12, 2018 | Download history page and enabled Web Bluetooth by default. |
| 7.0.10.44 | Chromium 59 | March 7, 2018 | WebGL2, Intersection Observer API, WebAssembly (included in Chromium 59), Safe Browsing |
| 7.2.10.33 | Chromium 59 | June 7, 2018 | |
| 7.4.00.70 | Chromium 59 | August 20, 2018 | Authentication with Intelligent Scan, a customized Reader Mode, and download history improvements, Quick Suggest (United States), news notifications (United States). |
| 8.0.00.90 | Chromium 63 | August, 2018 | |
| 8.2.01.2 | Chromium 63 | December 10, 2018 | Improved Download Manager, Do-Not-Track preference, and quick access sync via Smart Switch. |
| 9.0.01.79 | Chromium 67 | February 20, 2019 | One UI support |
| 9.2.00.70 | Chromium 67 | April 3, 2019 | One UI Night Mode, Dark Mode, WebAPK for Progressive Web Apps, Smart Anti-Tracking |
| 9.2.10.15 | Chromium 67 | May 20, 2019 | A video seek function for YouTube web videos with double tap gesture, and improvements. |
| 9.4.00.45 | Chromium 67 | July 22, 2019 | QR Code reader (re-introduced), a tab manager for tablet devices, a notification manager for web pushes, history navigation in each tab, video auto play control, a rename function when adding a web shortcut to home screen, and a Pause/Resume function for "Save all images". |
| 10.0 | Chromium 71 | August, 2019 | |
| 10.1.00.27 | Chromium 71 | September 9, 2019 | Quick Access data synchronization |
| 10.1.01.3 | Chromium 71 | October 4, 2019 | |
| 10.2.00.53 | Chromium 71 | November 25, 2019 | Video assistant, a feature that allows which apps use Samsung Internet, a customizable toolbar and menu, a renewed tab manager, toolbar customization, enhanced secret mode. |
| 10.2.01.10 | Chromium 71 | January 14, 2020 | An optional Picture-In-Picture video, easy sign-in using fingerprint in Samsung DeX stand-alone mode, and an enhanced scroll capture. |
| 11.0 | Chromium 75 | February, 2020 | One UI 2.0 support, Credential Management API support, browser extensions (which require Android 6 or later and a Galaxy Store account) |
| 11.1.1.52 | Chromium 75 | February 26, 2020 | |
| 11.1.2.2 | Chromium 75 | March 19, 2020 | |
| 11.2.1.3 | Chromium 75 | May 1, 2020 | Smart protection, support for more buttons in Customize menu, increased maximum number of open tabs to 99, added search engines, address and card sync via Samsung Pass, news notifications (India and China), usability enhancements for tablet devices |
| 11.2.2.3 | Chromium 75 | May 27, 2020 | |
| 12.0.1.47 | Chromium 79 | June 19, 2020 | Open links in secret mode from the context menu; more password manager apps are allowed to autofill ID and passwords |
| 12.1.1.36 | Chromium 79 | July 30, 2020 | Context menu added for Tab Bar, support for Augmented Reality websites (WebXR API) |
| 12.1.2.55 | Chromium 79 | August 28, 2020 | |
| 12.1.4.3 | Chromium 79 | September 29, 2020 | Changed Dark Mode background color to improve visibility |
| 13.0.1.64 | Chromium 83 | November 19, 2020 | Hide status bar option for Infinity Display, enhanced Smart Protection, additional gesture support in Video Assistant, changed permission request user interface to show a warning message if a website looks malicious, double-tap to pause videos while in Video Assistant full-screen, added option to edit bookmark titles as bookmarks are being added, expanded browser extension APIs for developers, improved Secret Mode description on Secret Mode launch page, OneUI 3 enhancements (hides non-scrollable elements while scrolling, expandable app bar available in menu screens), show or hide status bar while scrolling on webpages, High Contrast mode can be used while DarkMode is on, Secret Mode icon now displayed next to address bar when browsing in Secret Mode, rounded tab shapes |
| 13.0.2.9 | Chromium 83 | December 12, 2020 | |
| 13.2.1.70 | Chromium 83 | January 20, 2021 | Further enhanced Smart Protection, Augmented Reality Core upgrade, Dark Mode color scheme trial (CSS media query and property) |
| 13.2.2.4 | Chromium 83 | February 11, 2021 | |
| 13.2.3.2 | Chromium 83 | March 12, 2021 | |
| 14.0.1.62 | Chromium 87 | April 17, 2021 | Security control panel to enhance privacy, enhanced Smart Anti-Tracking (v3.0), ability to synchronize font settings for web pages across devices (Labs), direct writing gesture support with S Pen (Galaxy Tab S7), support for DCI-P3 color space (on displays that support DCI-P3 and Android 10 or later), autocomplete list item deletion, and show/hide toolbar in Quick Access page. Foldable device features include video flex mode and app pair (supports multiple browser windows) in edge panel. |
| 14.0.3.5 | Chromium 87 | May 20, 2021 | |
| 14.2.1.69 | Chromium 87 | June 24, 2021 | Website level permission settings, bookmark bar, Continue Apps (synchronize browser activity across devices), additional gestures available with S Pen, Quick Access page on launch, popup for new password autofill |
| 14.2.3.14 | Chromium 87 | July 29, 2021 | |
| 15.0.2.47 | Chromium 90 | August 28, 2021 | Increased protection against browser fingerprinting, a persistent Secret Mode, touching the search widget opens the browser immediately from the home screen, and Back-Forward cache support. |
| 15.0.4.9 | Chromium 90 | August 28, 2021 | |
| 15.0.6.3 | Chromium 90 | September 29, 2021 | |
| 15.0.6.3 | Chromium 90 | October 27, 2021 | All menu text is visible when select popup menu is selected |
| 16.0.2.19 | Chromium 92 | November 25, 2021 | Ability to move the URL bar to the bottom of the screen, HTTPS priority connection (Labs feature), Smart Protect blocks tracking pixels, address bar provides a list of results while searching, support for page zooming |
| 16.0.6.23 | Chromium 92 | December 30, 2021 | |
| 16.2.1.56 | Chromium 92 | March 11, 2022 | Support for tab groups, downloaded files are kept secret in Secret Mode, Dark Mode can be used independently of phone settings, adjustable text brightness in Dark Mode, link decoration tracking protection added to Smart Anti-Tracking, drag and drop images between Samsung Internet browser windows, customizable layout of tab bar and address bar |
| 16.2.5.4 | Chromium 92 | April 4, 2022 | |
| 17.0.1.69 | Chromium 96 | May 4, 2022 | Smart Anti-Tracking enabled by default (United States, Korea, Europe), client-side cookies expire after 7 days to minimize tracking, HTTPS scheme on websites used by default if present (falls back to HTTP if not), privacy board added to Quick Access Page, support for Storage Access API, URL bar relocated above keyboard on bottom layout, ability to move Tool menu buttons to Customize menu, draggable bookmarks in the Bookmark bar, video subtitle position enhancement for full screen video, improved search with typographical error detection and relative matching |
| 17.0.4.3 | Chromium 96 | May 28, 2022 | |
| 17.0.6.9 | Chromium 96 | June 15, 2022 | |
| 17.0.7.34 | Chromium 96 | July 2, 2022 | |
| 18.0.0.58 | Chromium 99 | August 6, 2022 | Ability to copy text from images on websites (requires OneUI 4.1.1), URL bar and toolbar appearance improved on foldable devices, CNAME cloaking protection in Smart Anti-Tracking, improvements to bouncing tracking and window.name tracking, and the ability to open app-based links in Secret Mode. Extensions can be used in Samsung's secure environment / Secure Folder. |
| 18.0.4.14 | | September 20, 2022 | |
| 19.0.1.2 | Chromium 102 | November 2, 2022 | Enhanced phishing detection, quickly accessible privacy information for each website visited, add-ons supported in Secret Mode, ability to sync bookmarks between Google Chrome browser on PC and Samsung Internet on phone with Samsung Internet Chrome Extension |
| 19.0.3.12 | Chromium 102 | December 6, 2022 | |
| 19.0.6.3 | Chromium 102 | December 29, 2022 | |
| 20.0.0.65 | Chromium 106 | February 10, 2023 | Bookmarks folder search, tab group search, option to delete history after a set period of time |
| 20.0.1.2 | Chromium 106 | February 20, 2023 | |
| 20.0.3.10 | Chromium 106 | March 10, 2023 | |
| 20.0.6.5 | Chromium 106 | April 4, 2023 | |
| 21.0.0.41 | Chromium 110 | May 19, 2023 | Ability to move the Tab Bar and Bookmark Bar to the bottom of the browser, ability to move the URL bar to the bottom of a tablet device |
| 21.0.3.6 | Chromium 110 | June 16, 2023 | |
| 22.0.0.54 | Chromium 111 | July 12, 2023 | Increased number of History lists, improved user experience when using tab manager list on tablet devices |
| 22.0.1.1 | Chromium 111 | July 15, 2023 | |
| 22.0.2.6 | Chromium 111 | July 27, 2023 | |
| 22.0.3.1 | Chromium 111 | August 4, 2023 | |
| 22.0.6.9 | Chromium 111 | September 14, 2023 | |
| 23.0.0.47 | Chromium 115 | October 20, 2023 | Increased number of days of History saved, URL auto-complete in address bar, support for syncing tab group information across devices, support for Passkey (login to websites using digital signatures) |
| 23.0.1.1 | Chromium 115 | November 30, 2023 | |
| 24.0.7.1 | Chromium 117 | March 29, 2024 | Support for syncing History |
| 25.0.0.41 | Chromium 121 | May 11, 2024 | Able to show menu bars while scrolling, attribution reporting (experimental, requires flag to enable) |
| 26.0.0.19 | Chromium 122 | April 2024 | Able to take screenshots in Secret Mode, search and bookmark widgets can be added to phone's home screen |
| 27.0.0.26 | Chromium 125 | August 2024 | Search support added to settings menu, end-to-end encryption (E2EE) of data synchronization |
| 27.0.0.79 | Chromium 125 | November 2024 | Removal of scrollbar customization options |
| 28.0.0.55 | Chromium 130 | April 2025 | Recommends closing old tabs |
| 28.0.2.43 | Chromium 130 | May 2025 | Redesigned menu, redesigned customization page |
| 29.0.0.59 | Chromium 136 | October 2025 | Closes unused tabs based on user setting (automatic detection or after a period of days), added Grid View Mode in tab manager for easier viewing |
| 29.0.4.46 | Chromium 136 | March 2026 | Added "Ask AI" feature (South Korea and United States), warning notification displayed when visiting known malicious websites |
| 30.0.0.25 | | February 2026 | |
| 30.0.2.45 | | June 2026 | Added ability to edit "More options" page |
| 30.0.5.24 | | August 28, 2026 | |
| 30.0.5.27 | | October 23, 2026 | |
| 31.0.0.81 | | November, 12, 2026 | |

=== Windows ===
| Version | Based on | Release date | New features |
|---|---|---|---|
| 30.0.0.95 | Chromium 143 | March 26, 2026 | Introduced AI features (Korea and the United States) |
| 30.0.0.97 | Chromium 143 | April 13, 2026 | |
| 30.0.1.40 | Chromium 143 | May 20, 2026 | Added ability to install websites as apps |
| 30.0.1.41 | Chromium 143 | June 9, 2026 | |
| 30.0.2.35 | Chromium 143 | June 24, 2026 | Improves the compatibility of webpages and improves the usability of "Ask anything." |
| 30.0.3.24 | Chromium 143 | July 21, 2026 | Added option to prevent storing search history from URL bar and search bar, support for setting multiple pages as startup page, device selection available when opening apps on mobile devices from the side panel |
| 30.0.3.25 | Chromium 143 | Aug 4, 2026 | B2B Features Updated |
| 30.0.4.29 | Chromium 143 | Aug 24, 2026 | Users can now easily access Galaxy Connect's connectivity features through the Galaxy Connect menu in the profile icon. Reminder is integrated into Calendar on the side panel and synced across Galaxy devices and Windows PC |

== Reception ==
=== Android ===
TechRadar Pro managing editor Désiré Athow published a review of Samsung's Internet browser for Android smartphones in July 2023. In his very positive review, he compares the web browser with the Google Chrome web browser, and suggests that Samsung's browser beats Google's on most topics he discusses. The positives include accessing webpages offline, segregated browsing history, faster loading of webpages, a QR code scanner, a password management system, a built-in video assistant, and a private browsing mode. The negatives he mentions include an absence of a free VPN, no built-in language translator, and a lack of data-saving options. He claims that the web browser is "a must-try for those looking for a fast and responsive browser".

Android Police's former senior writer Stephen Rodchia gave his opinion of Samsung's Internet browser in a November 2024 review, while comparing it with Google Chrome. In his review, he highlights the position of the toolbar, saying that it is easier to access from the bottom of the screen with one hand. Despite urging people to refrain from using ad blockers, he admits that Samsung gives people the option of using an ad blocker through a downloadable extension, which provides for an unobstructed reading experience, and claims that it is the web browser's biggest selling point. He says that while Samsung's web browser isn't perfect, he encourages readers to "give it a fair shot" as he believes that it offers additional flexibility that can't be matched by Google Chrome.

In October 2025, Mitja Rutnik, an editor of Android Authority, gave his reasons why he believed that the web browser is better than Google's. He explains that the browser's home page can be customised, adding websites to it when needed. Again, the toolbar was cited as being easier to use given its location at the bottom of the screen, but its customizability was also regarded as being more user-friendly and a logical approach than what Google Chrome offered, as six buttons out of 30 available can be selected into the toolbar. He noted that certain things are quicker to do, such as opening new tabs and starting a new search. He remarks that the Dark mode in Samsung's browser is better, as it not only changes the toolbar's colours, but also the colours of websites. Support for ad blockers was also considered a big advantage. Mitja concedes that Google Chrome is better in some ways, as it is available on desktop, is the faster web browser in certain benchmarks, and has a Discover feature that automatically fills with news based on preferences.

=== Windows ===
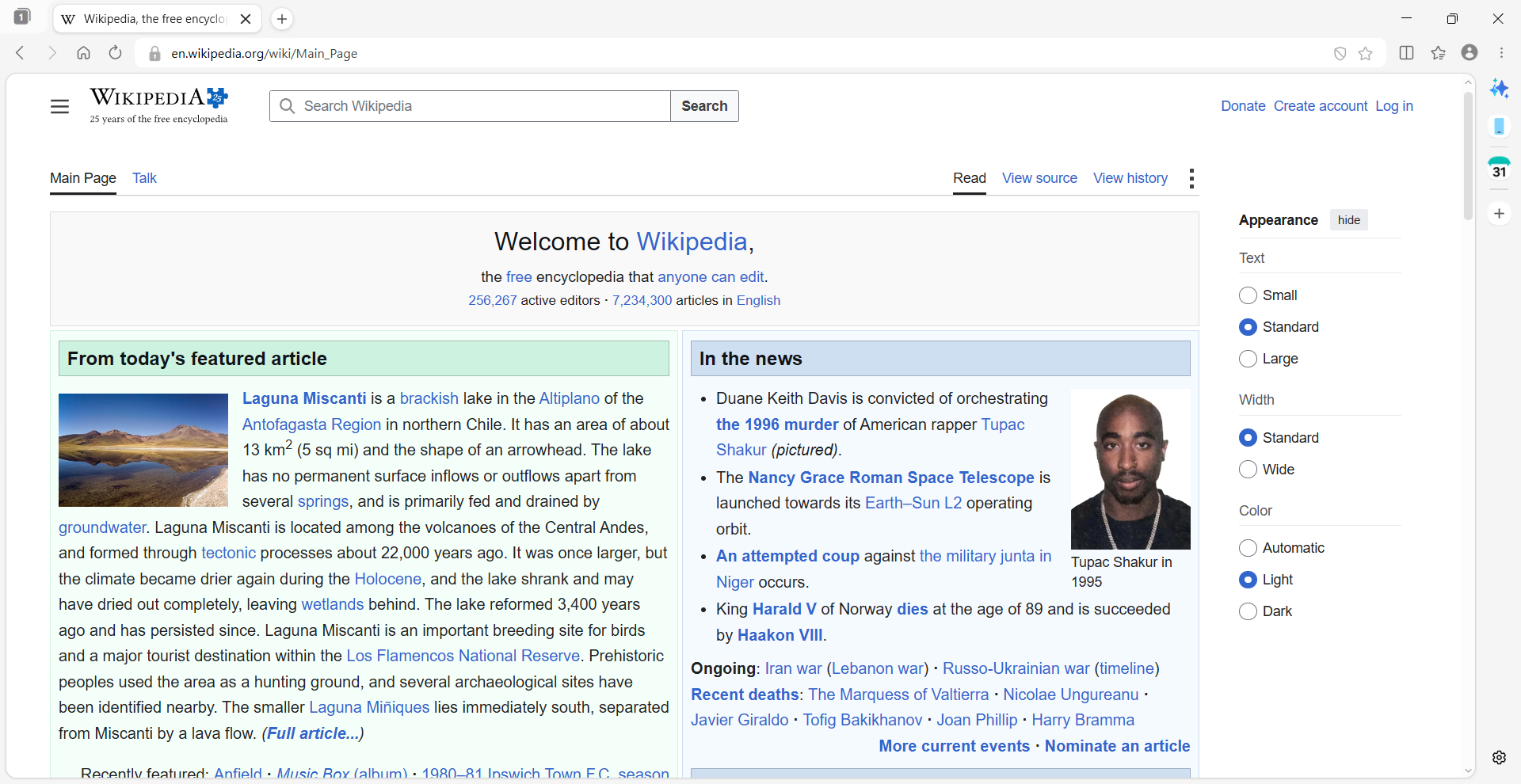
Screenshot of Windows 11 on Wikipedia

PCWorld staff writer Michael Crider wrote about his experience with the Windows version of the browser a day after it came out, in March 2026. His initial impression of the browser is "pretty good", highlighting that the built-in ad blocker could be enabled before start-up. He also claims that the browser is visually appealing with colour-matching tiles and thin bars that maximise web space before customisation. However, he explains that he had no desire to interact with the browser's AI, as most web browser developers were trying to "shove" AI into their browsers.
