= UBlock Origin =

Web browser content blocking extension

uBlock Origin

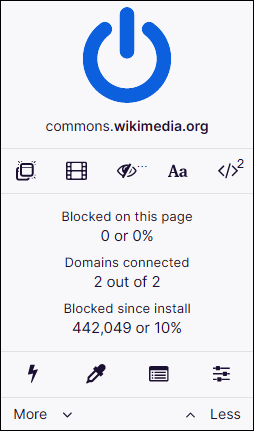
- uBlock Origin's pop-up interface
- Original author: Raymond Hill (gorhill)
- Developers: Current: Raymond Hill; Past: Deathamns, Chris Aljoudi, Alex Vallat
- Release: June 23, 2014; 12 years ago
- Stable release: 1.76.0 / 8 November 2026; 5 days ago
- Written in: JavaScript
- Operating system: Cross-platform
- Predecessor: HTTP Switchboard and uMatrix
- Available in: 72 languages
- Type: Browser extension
- License: GPLv3
- Repository: github.com/gorhill/uBlock

uBlock Origin (/ˈjuːblɒk/ YOO-blok) (uBO) is a free, open-source content browser extension for content filtering, including ad blocking. The extension is available for Chromium, Edge, Firefox, Brave, Opera, Pale Moon, as well as versions of Safari before 13 and Google Chrome before December 2024. uBlock Origin has received praise from technology websites and is reported to be much less memory-intensive than other extensions with similar functionality. uBlock Origin's stated purpose is to give users the means to enforce their own (content-filtering) choices.

uBlock Origin is actively developed and maintained by its creator and lead developer Raymond Hill and the open source community. uBlock Origin was deprecated on Chrome due to technical restraints, and a forked version called uBlock Origin Lite is available instead. As of October 2026, the Firefox version of uBlock Origin has over 11.3 million active users, making it the most popular extension on Firefox. The Chromium version of uBlock Origin Lite has 21 million active users.

== History ==
The development of uBlock Origin came about by forking the codebase of HTTP Switchboard, an extension designed to give users control over browser requests. uBlock, which was the predecessor of uBlock Origin, was further influenced by uMatrix, another browser extension created by forking HTTP Switchboard.

=== HTTP Switchboard ===
HTTP Switchboard was initially released on September 20, 2013. It enabled users to control the types of requests made by their browser, providing a way to block specific types of web content. However, development of HTTP Switchboard ceased on May 18, 2015.

=== uMatrix ===
In anticipation of the end of HTTP Switchboard's development, uMatrix was introduced on October 24, 2014. This extension was designed for advanced users and acted as a request firewall, allowing users to control browser requests across two main dimensions: the domains and subdomains to which requests were sent, and the types of requests (such as cookies, images, XMLHttpRequest, frames, and scripts). uMatrix retained much of the user interface from HTTP Switchboard, but significantly expanded its functionality, offering a more granular level of control over web requests.

In a public discussion on August 2, 2020, lead developer Raymond Hill stated that he lacked time to work on uMatrix because it was "a project large enough that [he] would be able to work on it only if [he] wasn't working on uBO." In response to a further comment, Hill stated he would never pass development to anyone after past experience, giving concerns such as monetisation and feature bloat, and he would instead "at most" archive it, offering others the chance to fork the project.

Development of uMatrix ended on July 21, 2021, without announcement, with the project's GitHub repository being converted to a public archive.

=== uBlock ===
"The author of HTTP Switchboard, an advanced blocker extension for Google Chrome that is probably the best right now when it comes to that, has released uBlock yesterday for the browser." - (June 24, 2014)

"uBlock Origin emerged in 2014, developed by a Quebecois programmer...Raymond Hill"

"uBlock, the Memory-Friendly Ad-Blocker, Is Now Available for Firefox" (January 27, 2015)

uBlock was initially named "μBlock" but the name was later changed to "uBlock" to avoid confusion as to how the Greek letter μ (Mu/Micro) in "μBlock" should be pronounced. Development started by forking from the codebase of HTTP Switchboard along with another blocking extension called uMatrix, designed for advanced users. uBlock was developed by Raymond Hill to use community-maintained block lists, while adding features and raising the code quality to release standards. First released in June 2014 as a Chrome and Opera extension, in 2015 the extension became available in other browsers. A joint Sourcepoint and comScore survey reported an 833% growth from November 2014 to August 2015, the strongest growth among adblockers listed. The report attributed the growth to the desire of users for pure blockers, outside the "acceptable ads" program operated by Adblock Plus.

The development of uBlock stopped in August 2015 after its April break with uBlock Origin but there were updates again starting in January 2017.

In July 2018, ublock.org was acquired by AdBlock and they resumed development. From February 2019, uBlock began allowing users to participate in "acceptable ads", a program run by Adblock Plus that allows some ads deemed "acceptable" and nonintrusive, and for which larger publishers pay a fee.

=== uBlock Origin ===
On April 3, 2015, Hill transferred the uBlock project to Chris Aljoudi due to frustrations with dealing with requests as the project's popularity increased. "These projects are to me, not a full time job. It stopped being a hobby when it felt more and more like a tedious job. I will keep maintaining my version (and share with whoever care[s] to use it) because it guarantees the tool will match what I want out of it." Hill created his own fork and renamed it uBlock Origin on April 6.

Since October 2017, uBlock Origin has been completely separated from Aljoudi's uBlock. Aljoudi created ublock.org to host and promote uBlock and to request donations. In response, uBlock's founder Raymond Hill stated that "the donations sought by ublock.org are not benefiting any of those who contributed most to create uBlock Origin." The development of uBlock stopped in August 2015 but there were sporadic updates from January 2017.

uBlock Origin remains independent and does not allow ads for payment. The project refuses donations and instead advises supporters to donate to maintainers of block lists. Hill continued to work on the extension under the name uBlock Origin, abbreviated as uBO and originally as uBlock_{0}.

In January 2016, uBlock Origin was added to the repositories for Debian 9 and Ubuntu 16.04. The extension was awarded "Pick of the Month" by Mozilla for May 2016.

On December 11, 2016, Nik Rolls released a fork of uBlock Origin for the Microsoft Edge browser (now known as Microsoft Edge Legacy). In April 2020, this fork was deprecated as Microsoft replaced Microsoft Edge Legacy with a Chromium-based Edge.

== Features ==
=== Blocking and filtering ===
uBlock Origin supports the majority of Adblock Plus's filter syntax. The popular filter lists EasyList and EasyPrivacy are enabled by default. The extensions are capable of importing hosts files and a number of community-maintained lists are available at installation. Among the host files available, Peter Lowe's ad servers & tracking list and lists of malware domains such as uBlock Origin's own anti-malicious filter called Badware risks are also enabled as default, preventing users from visiting malicious websites such as those used for phishing, scams, malware, and more. Some additional features include dynamic filtering of scripts and iframes and a tool for webpage element hiding.

uBlock Origin supports multiple improvements over the original uBlock, such as color vision deficiency mode, a DOM inspector, and dynamic URL filtering.

There used to be a feature that protected against IP address leaks via WebRTC. However, this feature was removed in version 1.38 for all platforms except Android, as most browsers no longer have vulnerabilities related to WebRTC leaks.

Site-specific switches to toggle the blocking of pop-ups, strict domain blocking, cosmetic filtering, blocking remote fonts, and JavaScript disabling were also added to uBlock Origin. The Firefox version of uBlock Origin has an extra feature which helps to foil attempts by web sites to circumvent blockers.

uBlock Origin also supports modifying the response body of a request using the =replace directive. This allows it to effectively alter and deliver the modified response directly to the browser. However, this functionality is currently supported only on Firefox and Firefox-based browsers.

=== Performance and efficiency ===
Technology websites and user reviews for uBlock Origin have regarded the extension as less resource-intensive than extensions that provide similar feature sets such as Adblock Plus. A benchmark test, conducted in August 2015 with ten blocking extensions, showed uBlock Origin as the most resource-efficient among the extensions tested.

uBlock Origin surveys what style resources are required for an individual web page rather than relying on a universal style sheet. The extension takes a snapshot of the filters the user has enabled, which contributes to accelerated browser start-up speed when compared to retrieving filters from cache every time.

==== Differential updates ====
Starting with version 1.54, uBlock Origin introduced the implementation of differential updates (delta updates), which allows the extension to fetch only changes to filter lists rather than downloading the entire list. This results in lower bandwidth consumption and more frequent updates. This change was part of uBlock Origin's efforts to reduce both requests and bandwidth usage, with the goal of not being ranked among the most bandwidth-intensive projects on jsDelivr, as reflected in public statistics.

=== Limitations in Chromium-based browsers ===
According to Raymond Hill, the creator and lead developer of the extension, uBlock Origin works best on Firefox. The main reason is that uBlock Origin (uBO) faces several technical limitations when used on Chromium-based browsers compared to its performance on Firefox, and as a result, users may experience less effective ad blocking, potential exposure to unwanted content, and slower performance when using uBO on Chromium-based browsers.

==== CNAME Uncloaking ====
In November 2019, a uBlock Origin user reported a novel technique used by some sites to bypass third-party tracker blocking. These sites link to URLs that are sub-domains of the page's domain, but those sub-domains resolve to third-party hosts via a CNAME record. Since the initial URL contained a sub-domain of the current page, it was interpreted by browsers as a first-party request and so was allowed by the filtering rules in uBlock Origin (and in similar extensions). The uBlock Origin developer came up with a solution using a DNS API which is exclusive to Firefox 60+. The new feature was implemented in uBlock Origin 1.25, released on February 19, 2020.

Chromium-based browsers lack the ability to uncloak third-party servers disguised as first-party through CNAME records. This limitation reduces the efficiency of blocking third-party trackers, a capability that uBO fully utilizes on Firefox.

== Supported platforms ==
The main version of uBlock Origin is supported on Mozilla Firefox and Chromium-based browsers, although support on the latter is being phased out by major browsers (including Google Chrome, Microsoft Edge and Vivaldi) due to its use of a deprecated extension API.

=== uBlock Origin Lite ===
uBlock Origin Lite (uBOL) is a lightweight fork of uBlock Origin designed to be compatible with the current "Manifest V3" (MV3) extension specifications for Chromium-based web browsers. It is therefore the only variant of uBlock Origin officially supported by Chromium-based browsers that have deprecated older extension APIs. In August 2025, uBlock Origin Lite was also released for Safari on iOS, iPadOS, and macOS.

Unlike the original version of uBlock Origin, uBOL uses declarative rulesets compiled from existing uBO filter lists, and runs within an MV3 "Service Worker". Due to the architectural changes and limitations of MV3, its filtering capabilities are less granular than the mainline uBO (using a slider-based interface with "Basic", "Optimal", and "Complete" modes), not all of the cosmetic filtering capabilities of uBO are available in uBOL, filters cannot be updated independently of the extension itself, and custom filter lists cannot be added. These architectural changes allow the extension to operate in a more efficient manner than the mainline version of uBO.

A 2025 quantitative study by researchers at Goethe University Frankfurt found that uBOL's blocking capabilities were on par with (and, in some cases, slightly improved over) the mainline version of uBO, although its cosmetic filters were found to be around 20% less effective in testing.

== See also ==
- NoScript
- Privacy Badger
