= Pi-hole =

Network level ad- and tracker-blocking app

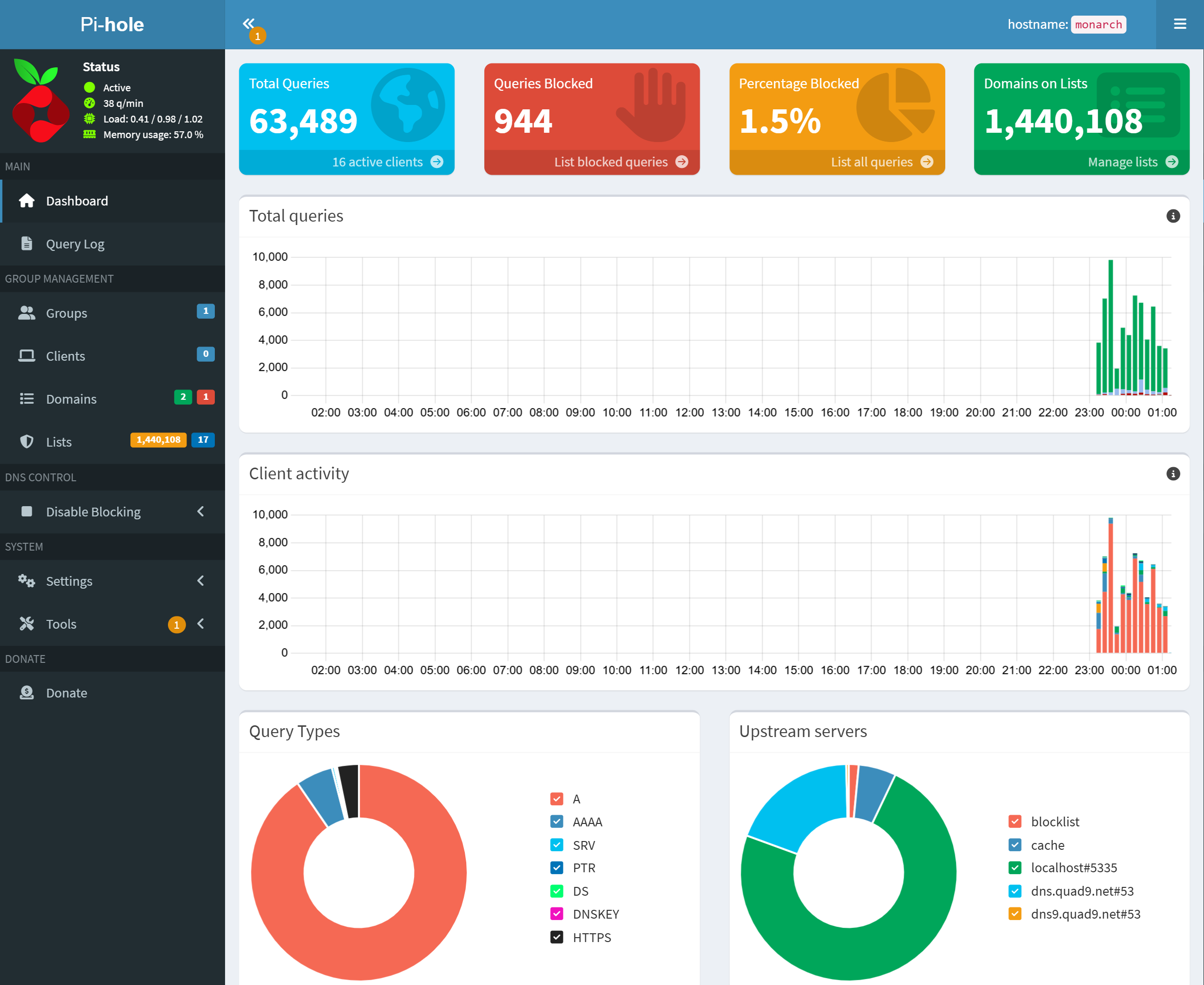
- Screenshot of the AdminLTE web interface for Pi-hole
- Developers: Pi-hole, LLC
- Release: June 15, 2015; 11 years ago
- Stable release: 6.4 / 27 November 2025; 9 months ago
- Written in: Bash, C (optional DNS server FTLDNS), PHP, CSS (optional web console)
- Operating system: Linux
- Licence: European Union Public Licence
- Website: pi-hole.net
- Repository: github.com/pi-hole

Pi-hole is a Linux network-level advertisement and Internet tracker blocking application which acts as a DNS sinkhole and optionally a DHCP server, intended for use on a private network. It is designed for low-power embedded devices with network capability, such as the Raspberry Pi, but can be installed on almost any Linux system. As well as importing externally prepared blocklists, Pi-hole can be configured to block specific websites or apply parental controls.

== History ==
The Pi-hole project was created by Jacob Salmela as an open source alternative to AdTrap in 2014 and was hosted on GitHub. Since then, several contributors have joined the project. In 2017, Pi-hole was registered in the United States as a trademark of Pi-Hole, LLC.

== Features ==
Pi-hole makes use of a modified dnsmasq called FTLDNS, cURL, lighttpd, PHP and the AdminLTE Dashboard to block DNS requests for known tracking and advertising domains. The application acts as a DNS server for a private network (replacing any pre-existing DNS server provided by another device or the ISP), with the ability to block advertisements and tracking domains for users' devices. It obtains lists of advertisement and tracking domains from a configurable list of predefined sources, and compares DNS queries against them. If a match is found within any of the lists, or a locally configured blocklist, Pi-hole will refuse to resolve the requested domain and respond to the requesting device with a dummy address.

Because Pi-hole blocks domains at the network level, it is able to block advertisements, such as banner advertisements on a webpage, but it can also block advertisements in unconventional locations, such as on Android, iOS and smart TVs.

Using VPN services, Pi-Hole can block domains without using a DNS filter setup in a router. Any device that supports VPNs can use Pi-Hole on a cellular network or a home network without having a DNS server configured. Integrating Pi-hole with a VPN allows users to extend ad-blocking and tracker-blocking capabilities to devices outside their local network. This setup can improve privacy and security on untrusted or public networks by funneling traffic through a secure connection.

The nature of Pi-hole allows it to also block website domains in general by manually adding the domain name to a blocklist. Likewise, domains can be manually added to an allowlist should a website's function be impaired by domains being blocked. Pi-hole can also function as a network monitoring tool, which can aid in troubleshooting DNS requests and network faults. Additionally, it can enhance security by blocking malicious domains and phishing attempts, reducing the risk of malware infections on connected devices. Pi-hole can also be used to encourage the use of DNS over HTTPS for devices using it as a DNS server with the cloudflared binary provided by Cloudflare.

== Difference from traditional advertisement blockers ==
Pi-hole can handle all DNS requests for the local network, meaning that advertisements and tracking domains are blocked for all devices behind it, whereas traditional advertisement blockers run in a user's web browser and remove advertisements only within that browser.

== See also ==
- Ad blocking
- Online advertising
