= Dolphin Anty =

Web browser

Dolphin{anty}
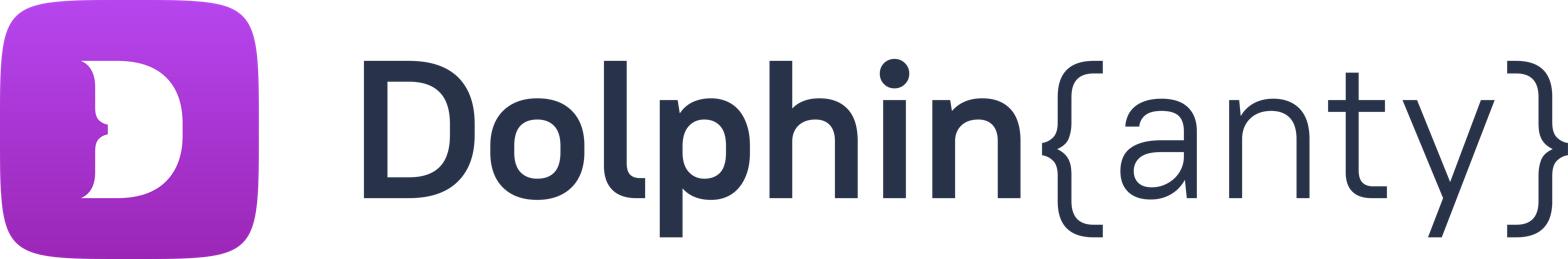
- Other names: Dolphin Anty, Dolphin{anty}
- Operating system: Windows, macOS, Linux
- Platform: Chromium
- Type: Web browser
- License: Proprietary
- Website: dolphin-anty.com

Dolphin (also known as Dolphin Anty or Dolphin{anty}) is a Chromium‑based antidetection web browser that allows creating isolated browser environments with configurable fingerprints.

== Overview ==
The Dolphin Anty browser was created for anti-detection purposes, allowing the management of multiple browser profiles simultaneously.

It allows users to create isolated browser profiles, each with unique fingerprints based on several parameters, including user agent, screen resolution, timezone, language, geolocation, WebRTC/WebGL parameters, fonts, MAC and IP address, and information about plugins, combined with optionally assigned proxy connections. Each profile acts as an independent browser instance to mimic unique devices and identities.

Dolphin{anty} supports deployment on Windows, Linux and macOS. It is typically used by affiliate marketers and SMM specialists running multiple ad or social media accounts; agencies or teams requiring account isolation for clients’ privacy and security, e‑commerce sellers managing multiple storefronts and developers conducting testing or scraping under varied device identities.

== Features ==
- It includes role-based access control, enabling admins to grant limited profile access to team members.
