= Periscope (service) =

Live video streaming app

- Screenshot Periscope (Android), Screenshot of live stream
- Original authors: Kayvon Beykpour; Joe Bernstein; Aaron Wasserman; Tyler Hansen; Geraint Davies
- Developer: Twitter, Inc.
- Release: March 26, 2015; 11 years ago
Final release
- Android: Varies with device / September 2, 2020; 6 years ago
- iOS: 1.108 / October 20, 2020; 6 years ago
- Written in: Go (server-side)
- Operating system: iOS, tvOS, Android
- Available in: Multilingual
- Type: Video streaming Social networking service
- Website: periscope.tv

Periscope was an American live video streaming app for Android and iOS developed by Kayvon Beykpour and Joe Bernstein and acquired by Twitter, Inc. before its launch in March 2015.

The service was discontinued on 31 March 2021 due to declining usage, product realignment, and high maintenance costs. However, Periscope videos can still be watched via Twitter, now called X, and most of its core features are now incorporated into the app.

== History ==
Kayvon Beykpour and Joe Bernstein came up with the idea for Periscope while traveling abroad in 2013. Beykpour was in Istanbul when protests broke out in Taksim Square. He wanted to see what was happening there, so he turned to Twitter. While he could read about the protests, he could not see them. They started the company in February 2014, under the name Bounty. They raised $1.5 million from Founder Collective, Scott Belsky, Maveron, Google Ventures, Menlo Ventures, Bessemer, Stanford – StartX and Sam Shank in April 2014.

Periscope was acquired January 2015 by Twitter before the product had been publicly launched. The acquisition was officially announced in a tweet from Periscope and retweeted by Twitter CEO Dick Costolo on 13 March after the rival video streaming app Meerkat was a breakout hit at South by Southwest 2015 (13–17 March). Meerkat became the talk of SXSW partially due to Twitter cutting Meerkat off from its social graph just as the festival was starting.

Periscope was launched on 26 March 2015. Later, on 26 May 2015, Periscope was released for Android. On 12 August 2015, Periscope announced that it had surpassed 10 million accounts, four months after it was launched. At the same time, the company noted that the amount of video being watched had reached a level of "40 years per day". On 9 December 2015, Apple named Periscope as the iPhone App of the Year. On 26 January 2016, the company released an update that allows users to stream live from GoPro. In December 2016, some of Periscope's features were integrated into the Twitter app.

In April 2016, as part of a wider partnership with Twitter to stream selected Thursday Night Football games, the NFL announced that Periscope would feature ancillary behind the scenes content from these games.

In June 2016, Democratic members of the U.S. House of Representatives staged a sit-in on the House floor to protest the lack of a vote on a gun control bill. The Speaker pro tem, Rep. Ted Poe, declared the House was in recess and subsequently the House video feed to C-SPAN was shut off. However, after a brief interruption, C-SPAN was able to broadcast the sit-in because Rep. Scott Peters streamed the activity and the speakers using his Periscope account.

On 12 June 2018, a Turkish court banned Periscope in Turkey for violating the copyright of the Turkish company called Periskop. Periscope had been actively used by the Turkish opposition until an initial ban was put in place in April 2017, weeks before a constitutional referendum to expand presidential powers.

== Service ==
The services of Periscope were available in the mobile application itself as well as on Twitter. Users of Periscope were able to choose whether or not to make their video public or simply viewable to certain users such as their friends or families. Although the "scoper" usually used a handheld device such as a smartphone to broadcast, it was also possible to broadcast through Periscope using a professional vision mixing suite such as Wirecast or Teradek using Periscope Pro. On 10 September 2015, Periscope added the ability to broadcast live in landscape view. Periscope's innovative live-streaming technology not only redefined real-time engagement but also paved the way for integrating live video features directly into social media platforms like Twitter, now X.

Periscope allowed viewers to send "hearts" to the broadcaster by tapping on the mobile screen as a form of appreciation. The maximum number of users that a user could follow is 8,000.

On 8 September 2015, TechCrunch reported and later confirmed that Periscope was building an Apple TV app. This app was released on 30 October 2015.

== Copyright issues ==
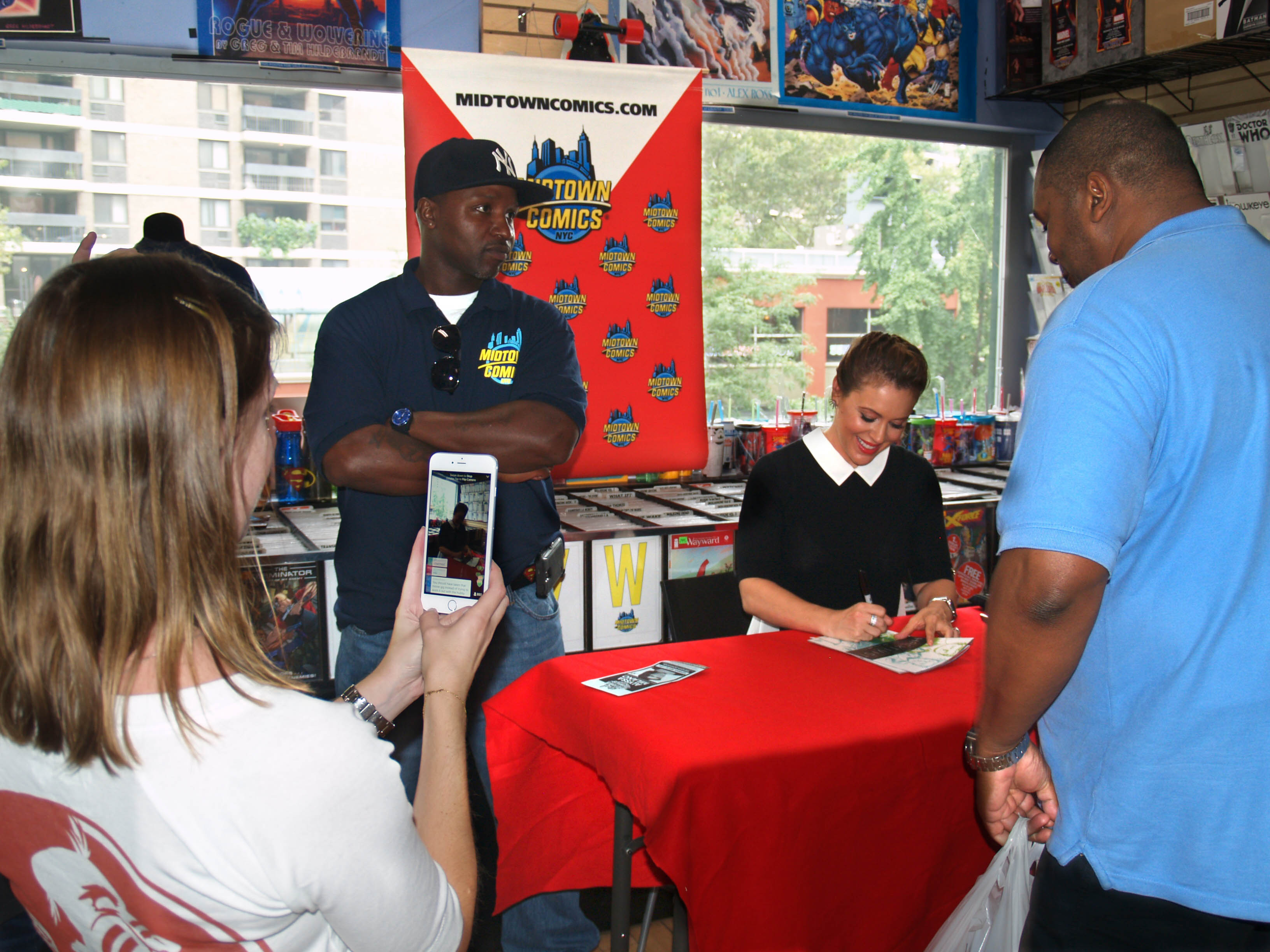
As actress Alyssa Milano autographs a copy of her graphic novel during an appearance at Midtown Comics in Manhattan, her assistant (left foreground) streams video of the event on Periscope.

The app could be misappropriated for copyright infringement, an issue that was raised around the time of the app's launch when several users of the service used it to air the fifth-season premiere of HBO's Game of Thrones live. HBO stated that the service needed better tools and policies to deal with copyrighted content.

These issues were magnified further by a professional boxing event on 2 May 2015, Floyd Mayweather Jr. vs. Manny Pacquiao, which was televised via a pay per view that cost approximately US$90, but saw wide unauthorised distribution through streams of various quality on Periscope. Rebroadcasting copyrighted content violates Periscope's written terms of service, and could result in suspension or banning the offending account.

Other complaints came from firms acting on behalf of the NFL, the Premier League, the US Open Tennis Championship, and Taylor Swift, according to data from Chilling Effects, which tracks online takedown notices and was started by an attorney Wendy Seltzer, several law school clinics and the Electronic Frontier Foundation. The Ultimate Fighting Championship, which kept a close eye on people it believes are illegally streaming its pay per view mixed martial arts matches, sent more than 650 takedown notices to Periscope, according to data from Chilling Effects.

== Discontinuation ==
The services of Periscope were scheduled to end in March 2021. The decision was made as a result of the app's declining popularity over time as other social media platforms with similar live-streaming capabilities gained traction.

Periscope was removed from its respective stores in Android and iOS on 31 March 2021. However, the videos of the service can still be watched via Twitter, as most of its features are now incorporated into the app.

In 2023, Twitter CEO Elon Musk streamed from his Twitter account, saying he was using "2015 Periscope code," and "we're just testing the live video feature so we can see if it works, and we can modify it accordingly".
