= Jonathan Zittrain =

American law professor (born 1969)

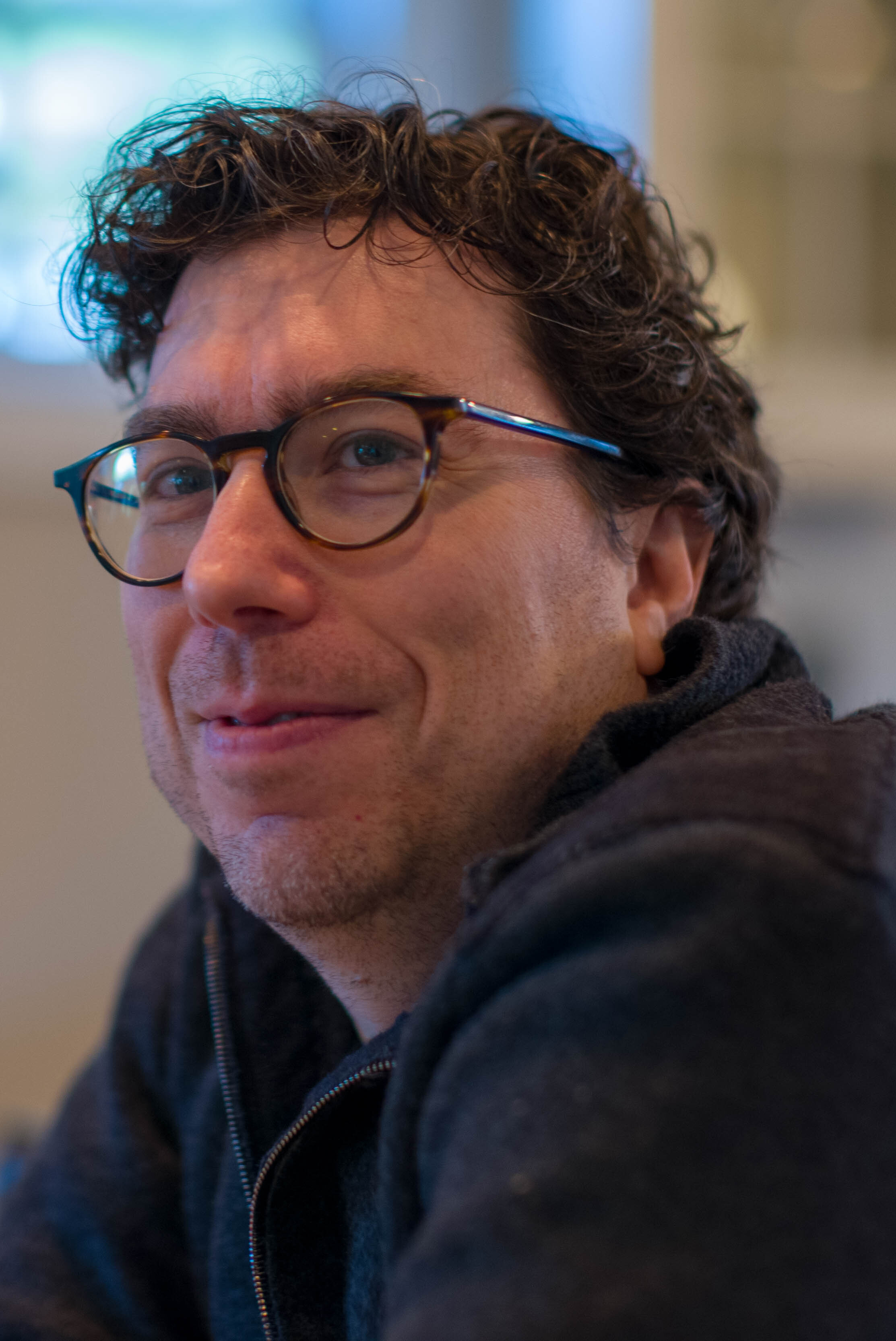
- Zittrain in 2018
- Born: December 24, 1969 (age 56); Pittsburgh, Pennsylvania, U.S.
- Education: Yale University (BS); Harvard University (JD, MPA)
- Occupations: Professor, pioneer of cyberlaw
- Organizations: Harvard University; Electronic Frontier Foundation
- Website: cyber.law.harvard.edu/people/jzittrain

Jonathan L. Zittrain (born December 24, 1969) is an American professor of Internet law and the George Bemis Professor of International Law at Harvard Law School. He is also a professor at the Harvard Kennedy School, a professor of computer science at the Harvard School of Engineering and Applied Sciences, and co-founder and director of the Berkman Klein Center for Internet & Society. Previously, Zittrain was Professor of Internet Governance and Regulation at the Oxford Internet Institute of the University of Oxford and visiting professor at the New York University School of Law and Stanford Law School. He is the author of The Future of the Internet and How to Stop It as well as co-editor of the books, Access Denied (MIT Press, 2008), Access Controlled (MIT Press, 2010), and Access Contested (MIT Press, 2011).

Zittrain works in several intersections of the Internet with law and policy including intellectual property, censorship and filtering for content control, and computer security. He founded a project at the Berkman Klein Center for Internet & Society that develops classroom tools. In 2001 he helped found Chilling Effects, a collaborative archive created by Wendy Seltzer to protect lawful online activity from legal threats. He also served as vice dean for Library and Information Resources at Harvard.

== Early life ==
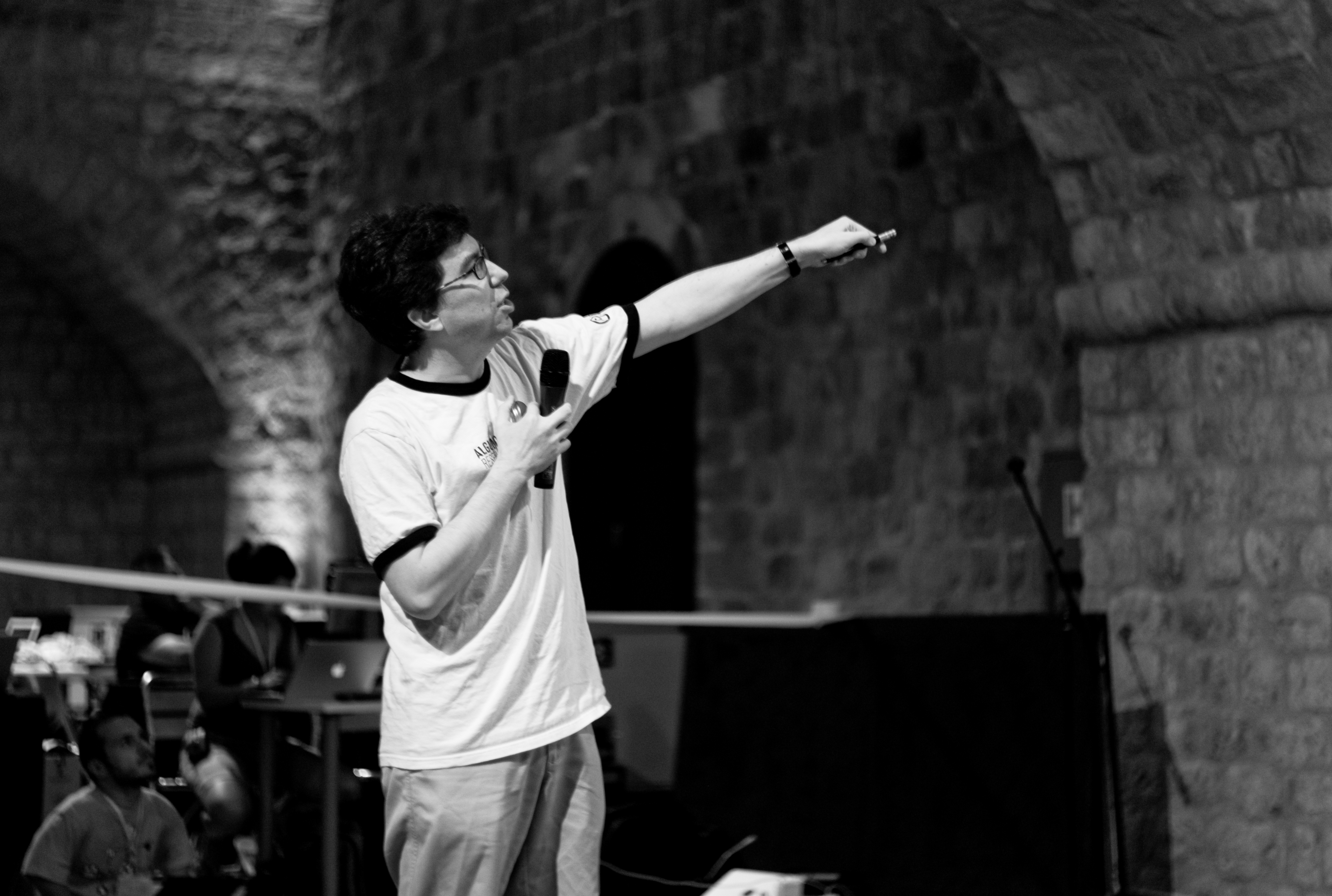
Zittrain speaking at iSummit07

Zittrain is the son of two attorneys, Ruth A. Zittrain and Lester E. Zittrain. In 2004 with Jennifer K. Harrison, Zittrain published The Torts Game: Defending Mean Joe Greene, a book the authors dedicated to their parents. His brother, Jeff, is an established Bay Area musician. His sister, Laurie Zittrain Eisenberg, is a scholar of the Arab and Israeli conflict and teaches at Carnegie Mellon University in Pittsburgh.

Zittrain, who grew up in the suburb of Churchill outside of Pittsburgh, graduated in 1987 from Shady Side Academy, a private school in Pittsburgh, Pennsylvania. He holds a bachelor's summa cum laude in cognitive science and artificial intelligence from Yale University, 1991, where he was a member of the Yale Political Union, Manuscript Society and Davenport College, a JD magna cum laude from Harvard Law School, 1995, where he was the winner of the Williston Negotiation Competition, and a Master of Public Administration from Harvard's John F. Kennedy School of Government, 1995.

== Career ==
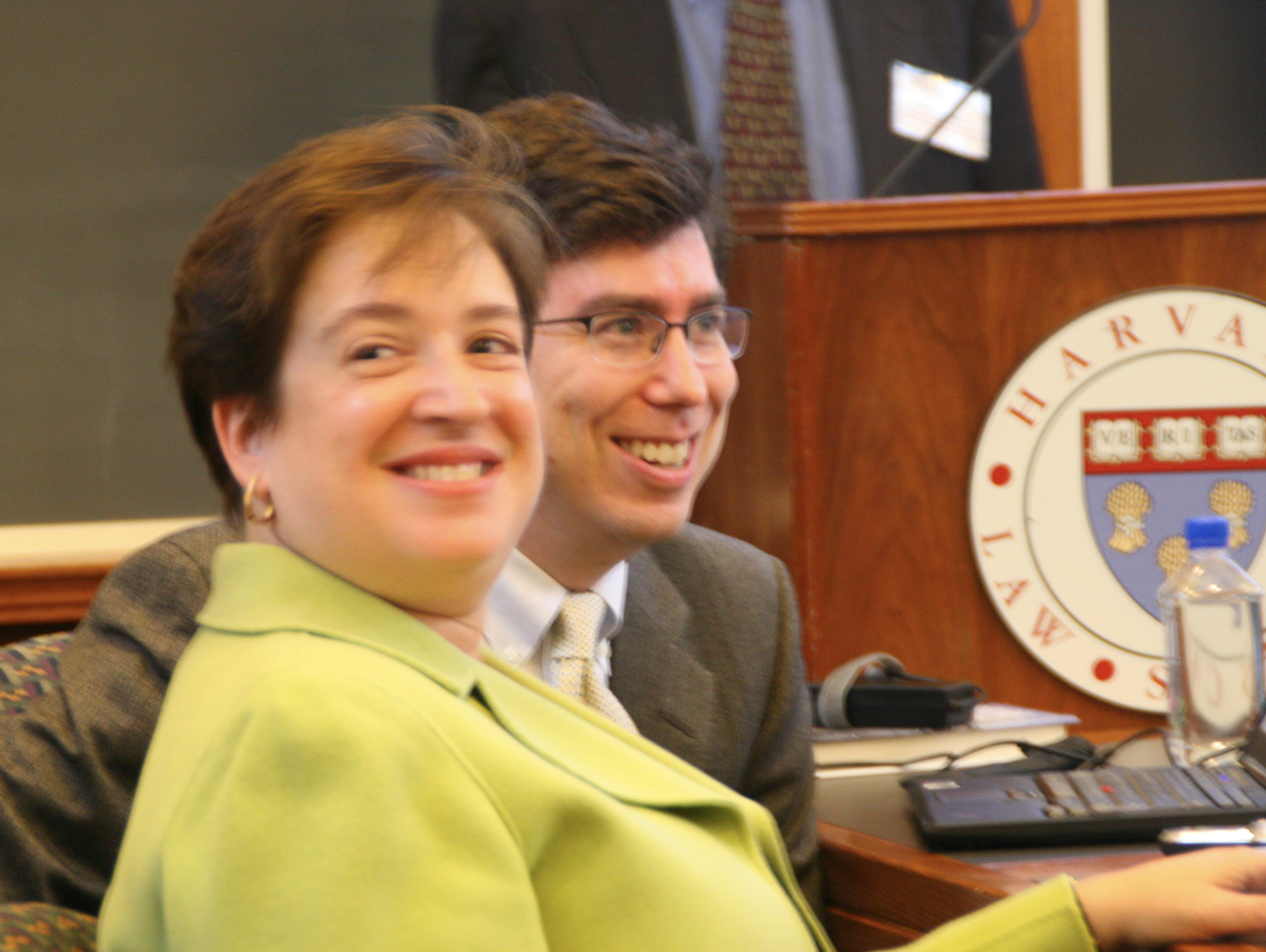
Zittrain and Elena Kagan in 2008 at a conference marking the tenth anniversary of United States v. Microsoft Corp.

Zittrain clerked for Stephen F. Williams of the United States Court of Appeals for the District of Columbia Circuit and served with the U.S. Department of Justice and, in 1991, with the Department of State, as well as at the Senate Select Committee on Intelligence in 1992 and 1994. He was also a longtime forum administrator, or sysop, for the online service CompuServe, serving for many years as the chief administrator for its private forum for all of its forum administrators.

Zittrain joined the staff of the University of Oxford in September 2005. He held the Chair in Internet Governance and Regulation, was a principal of the Oxford Internet Institute, and was a Professorial Fellow of Keble College, which has developed a particular interest in computer science and public policy. In the United States, he was also the Jack N. & Lillian R. Berkman Visiting Professor for Entrepreneurial Legal Studies at Harvard Law School in Cambridge, Massachusetts and director and founder with Charles Nesson of its Berkman Center for Internet & Society. Zittrain was a visiting professor at the Stanford Law School in 2007 and was a visiting professor at New York University School of Law in Manhattan for the spring 2008 semester.

Zittrain taught, or taught with others, Harvard's courses on Cyberlaw: Internet Points of Control, The Exploding Internet: Building A Global Commons in Cyberspace, Torts, Internet & Society: The Technologies and Politics of Control, The Law of Cyberspace, The Law of Cyberspace: Social Protocols, Privacy Policy, The Microsoft Case, and The High Tech Entrepreneur. He searched for novel ways to use technology unobtrusively in the classroom at Harvard, founded H2O and used the system to teach his classes. Students are polled, assigned opposing arguments, and use H2O to develop their writing skills. Students enrolled in his The Internet and Society class could participate both orally and via the Internet. A teaching fellow seated in the classroom supplied Zittrain with the comments received from students in real time via e-mail as well as through "chat" or "instant message" from students participating in the class while logged into Second Life. (www.secondlife.com)

He has been critical of the process used by ICANN, the International Telecommunication Union and the World Summit on the Information Society. Although he describes their approach as, in some ways, simple and naïve, Zittrain sees more hope in the open Internet Engineering Task Force model and in the ethical code and assumption of good faith that govern Wikipedia. He wrote in 2008, "Wikipedia—with the cooperation of many Wikipedians—has developed a system of self-governance that has many indicia of the rule of law without heavy reliance on outside authority or boundary."

In 2009 Zittrain was elected to the Internet Society's board of trustees for a four-year term. In February 2011 he joined the board of the Electronic Frontier Foundation. In May 2011 Zittrain was made for Federal Communications Commission Distinguished Scholar. In May 2012 he was made for Chair at Federal Communications Commission Open Internet Advisory Committee.

=== Internet filtering ===
Between 2001 and 2003 at Harvard's Berkman Center, Zittrain and Benjamin Edelman studied Internet filtering. The OpenNet Initiative (ONI) monitors Internet censorship by national governments. In their tests during 2002, when Google had indexed almost 2.5 billion pages, they found sites blocked, from approximately 100 in France and Germany to 2,000 in Saudi Arabia, and 20,000 in the People's Republic of China. The authors published a statement of issues and a call for data that year.

Building on the work completed at the Berkman Center, ONI published special reports, case studies, and bulletins beginning in 2004, and as of 2008, offered research on filtering in 40 countries as well as by regions of the world. As of 2016, Zittrain remains a principal investigator at ONI, together with Ronald Deibert of the University of Toronto, John Palfrey, who was previously the executive director of the Berkman Center (now the head of School at Phillips Academy in Andover, Massachusetts), and Rafal Rohozinski of the University of Cambridge.

In 2001, Zittrain cofounded Chilling Effects with his students and former students, including its creator and leader, Wendy Seltzer. It monitors cease and desist letters. Google directs its users to Chilling Effects when its search results have been altered at the request of a national government. Since 2002, researchers have been using the clearinghouse (renamed "Lumen" in 2015) to study the use of cease-and-desist letters, primarily looking at DMCA 512 takedown notices, non-DMCA copyright, and trademark claims.

=== Copyright ===
On October 9, 2002, Zittrain and Lawrence Lessig argued a landmark case, known as Eldred v. Ashcroft, before the United States Supreme Court. As co-counsel for the plaintiff, they argued that the Sonny Bono Copyright Term Extension Act (CTEA) was unconstitutional. The court ruled 7–2 on January 15, 2003, to uphold the CTEA which extended existing copyrights 20 years, from the life of the author plus 50 years, to plus 70 years. In the words of Justice Ruth Bader Ginsburg, the petitioners did "not challenge the CTEA's 'life-plus-70-years' time span itself. They maintain that Congress went awry not with respect to newly created works, but in enlarging the term for published works with existing copyrights." The court found that the act did "not exceed Congress' power" and that "CTEA's extension of existing and future copyrights does not violate the First Amendment". In 2003 Zittrain said he was concerned that Congress will hear the same arguments after the 20-year extension passes, and that the Internet is causing a "cultural reassessment of the meaning of copyright".

=== Security ===
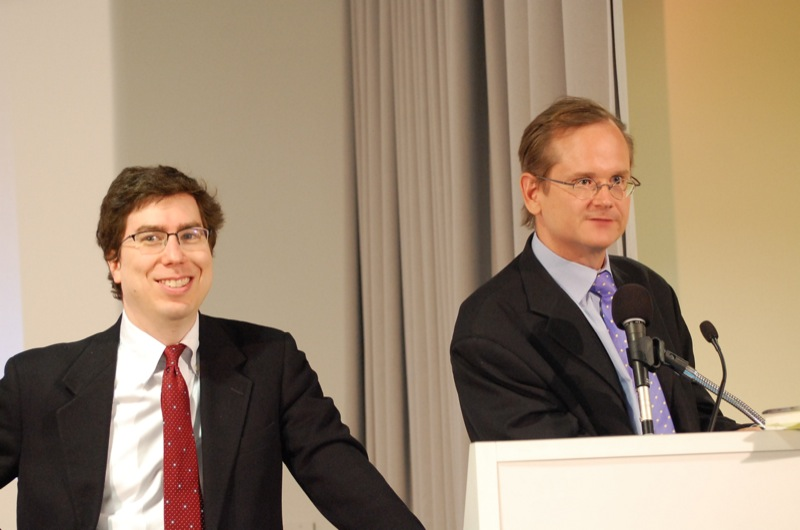
Zittrain and Lawrence Lessig speaking at Google in 2008

After Zittrain joined the staff at Oxford, Zittrain and John Palfrey at the Berkman Center founded StopBadware.org in 2006 to function as a clearinghouse for what has become proliferation of malware. Borrowing Wikipedia's "ethical code that encourages users to do the right thing rather than the required thing", the organization wished to assign the task of data collection—and not analysis—about malware to Internet users at large. When its scans find dangerous code, Google places StopBadware alerts in its search results and rescans later to determine whether a site thereafter had been cleaned.

One of StopBadware's goals is to "preempt" the stifling of the Internet. The founders think that centralized regulation could follow a serious Internet security breach, and that consumers might then choose to purchase closed, centrally managed solutions like tethered appliances that are modified by their vendor rather than owner, or might flee to services in walled gardens. In Zittrain's word, "generative" devices and platforms, including the Internet itself, offer an opening forward. In 2007, he cautioned, "...we're moving to software-as-service, which can be yanked or transformed at any moment. The ability of your PC to run independent code is an important safety valve."

Reactions in the Boston Review accompanied the publication of his book, The Future of the Internet and How to Stop It, in 2008. Support came from David D. Clark and Susan P. Crawford. Criticism ranged from Richard Stallman's finding no evidence of a flight to closed systems and his message that software developers need control and software patents must end, to a request for cost-benefit analysis, to the belief that netizenship will not scale to the business world to faith that consumers will buy only open, non-proprietary systems.

Directed by Palfrey and Zittrain, StopBadware received high-level guidance from its advisory board: Vint Cerf of Google, Esther Dyson, George He of Lenovo, Greg Papadopoulos (formerly CTO of Sun Microsystems), and Ari Schwartz of the Center for Democracy and Technology. The working group, which has included Ben Adida, Scott Bradner, Beau Brendler, Jerry Gregoire, Eric L. Howes, and Nart Villeneuve at various times, frames the project's research agenda and methodology and is the body which helps to inform the public about StopBadware's work. StopBadware has been supported by AOL, Google, eBay/PayPal, Lenovo, Trend Micro, and VeriSign and its use has been advised by Consumer Reports WebWatch.

=== Stock markets and spam ===
Writing with Laura Freider of Purdue University, in 2008 Zittrain published Spam Works: Evidence from Stock Touts and Corresponding Market Activity, in the Hastings Communications and Entertainment Law Journal to document the manipulation of stock prices via spam e-mail. They found evidence that "stocks experience a significantly positive return on days prior to heavy touting via spam" and that "prolific spamming greatly affects the trading volume of a targeted stock". Apart from transaction costs, in some circumstances the spammer earned over 4% while the average investor who bought on the day of receipt of the spam would lose more than 5% if they sold two days later. Frieder said in 2006 that she knew of no other explanation for their results, but that people do follow the stock tips in their spam e-mail.

=== Facebook ===
In February 2019, Zittrain interviewed Facebook CEO Mark Zuckerberg as part of a seminar for students at Harvard on the internet and society. In the interview, Zuckerberg discussed the obligations of Facebook to its users, saying “The idea of us having a fiduciary relationship with the people who use our services is intuitive... what we’re doing is that we’re acting as fiduciaries and trying to build services for people"

== Select publications ==
- Zittrain, Jonathan (April 14, 2008). The Future of the Internet and How to Stop It (PDF). Yale University Press. ISBN 978-0-300-12487-3.
- Deibert, Ronald J.; Palfrey, John G.; Rohozinski, Rafal; Zittrain, Jonathan, eds. (February 29, 2008). Access Denied: The Practice and Policy of Global Internet Filtering. MIT Press. ISBN 978-0-262-54196-1.
- Frieder, Laura; Zittrain, Jonathan (March 14, 2007). "Spam Works: Evidence from Stock Touts and Corresponding Market Activity". Berkman Center Research Publication No. 2006-11. SSRN 920553.
- Zittrain, Jonathan (2006). "Searches and Seizures in a Networked World". Harvard Law Review Forum. 83. The Harvard Law Review Association. SSRN 916046.
- Zittrain, Jonathan L. (May 2006). "The Generative Internet" (PDF). Harvard Law Review. 119. The Harvard Law Review Association: 1974.
- Zittrain, Jonathan (Spring 2006). "A History of Online Gatekeeping" (PDF). Harvard Journal of Law and Technology. 19 (2). Harvard Law School: 253.
- Zittrain, Jonathan (Winter 2004). "Normative Principles for Evaluating Free and Proprietary Software". University of Chicago Law Review. 71 (1). The University of Chicago Law School via SSRN. SSRN 529862.
