= Floc =

Floc can refer to:

- Farm Labor Organizing Committee, a labor union
- Federated Learning of Cohorts (FLoC), a type of web tracking for interest-based advertising
- Floc (or flock), flake of precipitate that comes out of solution during the process of flocculation
- Floc (biofilm), a specialized biofilm suspended in water
- Floc de Gascogne, a sweet apéritif made from a blend of grape juice and Armagnac
