= Media type =

Identifier for file formats

In information and communications technology, a media type, content type or MIME type is a two-part identifier for file formats and content formats. Their purpose is comparable to filename extensions and uniform type identifiers, in that they identify the intended data format. They are mainly used by technologies underpinning the Internet, and also used on Linux desktop systems.

The Internet Assigned Numbers Authority (IANA) is the official authority for the standardization and publication of these classifications. Media types were originally defined in Request for Comments RFC 2045, Multipurpose Internet Mail Extensions (MIME) Part One: Format of Internet Message Bodies, in November 1996 as part of the MIME specification, for denoting type of email message content and attachments; hence the original name, MIME type. Media types are also used by other internet protocols such as HTTP, document file formats such as HTML, and the XDG specifications implemented by Linux desktop environments, for similar purposes.

== Terminology ==
Different internet standards or web standards bodies differ on the preferred term for this type of identifier.

The IANA and IETF use the term "media type", and consider the term "MIME type" to be obsolete, since media types have become used in contexts unrelated to email, such as HTTP. By contrast, the WHATWG continues to use the term "MIME type" and discourages use of the term "media type" as ambiguous, since it is used with a different meaning in connection with the CSS @media feature.

The HTTP response header for providing the media type is Content-Type. The W3C has used ContentType as an XML data-type name for a media type. XDG specifications implemented by Linux desktop environments continue to use the term "MIME type".

== Structure ==
A media type consists of a type and a subtype, which is further structured into a tree. A media type can optionally define a suffix and parameters:

mime-type = type "/" [tree "."] subtype ["+" suffix] *[";" parameter];

As an example, an HTML file might be designated text/html; charset=UTF-8. In this example, text is the type, html is the subtype, and charset=UTF-8 is an optional parameter indicating the character encoding.

Types, subtypes, and parameter names are case-insensitive. Parameter values are usually case-sensitive, but may be interpreted in a case-insensitive fashion depending on the intended use.

=== Types ===
The "type" part defines the broad use of the media type. As of November 1996, the registered types were application, audio, image, message, multipart, text and video. By July 2024, the registered types included the foregoing, plus font, example, model, and haptics.

An unofficial top-level type in common use is chemical, used for chemical file formats. In the context of Linux desktop environments, the unofficial top-level types inode (inodes other than normal files, such as filesystem directories, device files or symbolic links), x-content (removable media, such as x-content/image-dcf for DCF digital cameras), package (package manager packages) and x-office (generic categories of office productivity software document) are used.

=== Subtypes ===
A subtype typically consists of a media format, but it may also contain other content, such as a tree prefix, producer, product, or suffix, depending on the rules in registration trees.

All media types should be registered using the IANA registration procedures. To improve the efficiency and flexibility of the media type registration process, different subtype structures can be registered in registration trees, distinguished by tree prefixes. Four registration trees are defined: standard (no prefix), vendor (vnd. prefix), personal or vanity (prs. prefix), and unregistered (x. prefix). These registration trees were first defined in November 1996 (obsoleted RFC 2048 - currently RFC 6838). New registration trees may be created by IETF Standards Action for external registration and management by well-known permanent organizations (e.g. scientific societies).

==== Standards tree ====
The standards tree does not use any tree prefix. Examples are text/javascript, image/png.

Registrations in the standards tree must be either associated with IETF specifications approved directly by the IESG, or registered by an IANA recognized standards-related organization.

==== Vendor tree ====
The vendor tree includes media types associated with publicly available products. It uses the vnd. tree prefix. Examples are: application/vnd.ms-excel, application/vnd.oasis.opendocument.text.

The terms "vendor" and "producer" are considered equivalent in the context. Industry consortia as well as non-commercial entities can register media types in the vendor tree. A registration in the vendor tree may be created by anyone who needs to interchange files associated with some software product or set of products. However, the registration belongs to the vendor or organization producing the software that employs the type being registered, and that vendor or organization can at any time elect to assert ownership of a registration done by a third party.

==== Personal or vanity tree ====
The personal or vanity tree includes media types associated with non publicly available products or experimental media types. It uses the prs. tree prefix. Examples are audio/prs.sid, image/prs.btif.

==== Unregistered tree ====
The unregistered tree includes media types intended exclusively for use in private environments and only with the active agreement of the parties exchanging them. It uses the x. tree prefix. Examples are application/x.foo, video/x.bar. Media types in this tree cannot be registered.

This type was originally defined in RFC 1590 (published in September 1993) using the x- or X- prefix. RFC 2048 (published in November 1996) introduced the x. prefix, but discouraged use of the unregistered tree, as new personal and vendor trees with relaxed registration requirements are now available. The current RFC 6838 (published in January 2013) maintains the same recommendation, but subtypes prefixed with x- or X- are no longer considered to be members of this tree.

Media types that have been widely deployed (with a subtype prefixed with x- or X-) without being registered, should be, if possible, re-registered with a proper prefixed subtype. If this is not possible, the media type can, after an approval by both the media types reviewer and the IESG, be registered in the standards tree with its unprefixed subtype. application/x-www-form-urlencoded is an example of a widely deployed type that ended up registered with the x- prefix.

=== Suffix ===
Suffix is an augmentation to the media type definition to additionally specify the underlying structure of that media type, allowing for generic processing based on that structure and independent of the exact type's particular semantics. Media types that make use of a named structured syntax should use the appropriate IANA registered "+"suffix for that structured syntax when they are registered. Unregistered suffixes should not be used (since January 2013). Structured syntax suffix registration procedures are defined in RFC 6838.

The +xml suffix has been defined since January 2001 (RFC 3023), and was formally included in the initial contents of the Structured Syntax Suffix Registry along with +json, +ber, +der, +fastinfoset, +wbxml, and +zip in January 2013 (RFC 6839). Subsequent additions include +gzip, +cbor, +json-seq, and +cbor-seq.

=== Common examples ===
From the IANA registry:

- application/json
- application/ld+json (JSON-LD)
- application/msword (.doc)
- application/pdf
- application/sql
- application/vnd.api+json
- application/vnd.microsoft.portable-executable (.efi, .exe, .dll)
- application/vnd.ms-excel (.xls)
- application/vnd.ms-powerpoint (.ppt)
- application/vnd.oasis.opendocument.text (.odt)
- application/vnd.openxmlformats-officedocument.presentationml.presentation (.pptx)
- application/vnd.openxmlformats-officedocument.spreadsheetml.sheet (.xlsx)
- application/vnd.openxmlformats-officedocument.wordprocessingml.document (.docx)
- application/x-www-form-urlencoded
- application/xml
- application/zip
- application/zstd (.zst)
- audio/mpeg
- audio/ogg
- image/avif
- image/jpeg (.jpg, .jpeg, .jfif, .pjpeg, .pjp)
- image/png
- image/svg+xml (.svg)
- image/tiff (.tif)
- model/obj (.obj)
- multipart/form-data
- text/plain
- text/css
- text/csv
- text/html
- text/javascript (.js)
- text/xml

== Mailcap ==
Mailcap (derived from the phrase "mail capability") is a type of meta file used to configure how MIME-aware applications such as mail clients and web browsers render files of different MIME-types. The mailcap format is defined by RFC 1524 "A User Agent Configuration Mechanism for Multimedia Mail Format Information" but is not defined as an Internet standard. It is supported by most Unix systems.

Lines can be comments starting with the # character, or a mime-type followed by how to handle that mime type.

== mime.types ==
An associated file is the mime.types file, which associates filename extensions with a MIME type. If the MIME type is properly set, this is unnecessary, but MIME types may be incorrectly set, or set to a generic type such as application/octet-stream, and mime.types allows one to fall back on the extension in these cases. Similarly, since many file systems do not store MIME type information, but instead rely on the filename extension, a mime.types file is frequently used by web servers to determine MIME type.

When viewing a file, these two work together as follows: mime.types associates an extension with a MIME type, while mailcap associates a MIME type with a program.

In UNIX-type systems, the mime.types file is usually located at /etc/mime.types and/or $HOME/.mime.types and the format is simply that each line is a space-delimited list of a MIME type, followed by zero or more extensions. For example, the HTML type can be associated with the extensions .htm and .html by the following line:

text/html     htm   html

=== Use in Netscape Web browser ===
The mime.types file dates to Netscape, where it used a different format; it used key–value pairs and a comma-separated list of extensions, together with a standard header consisting of a specific comment that identifies the file as a mime.types file, as follows:

#--Netscape Communications Corporation MIME Information
# Do not delete the above line. It is used to identify the file type.

type=text/html exts=htm,html

== See also ==
- Content negotiation
- Content sniffing
- Filename extension
- Uniform Type Identifier
- data URI scheme
