= Improving Web Advertising Business Group =

W3C subcommittee focused on online advertising

- Abbreviation: IWABG
- Formation: 2017; 9 years ago
- Type: Committee
- Members: 412
- Chair: Wendy Seltzer
- Parent organization: World Wide Web Consortium
- Website: www.w3.org/community/web-adv/

The Improving Web Advertising Business Group (IWABG) is a subcommittee of the World Wide Web Consortium with a focus on online advertising. In January 2020, Google encouraged advertising technology companies to join the group as a way to participate in the company's Privacy Sandbox initiative. The IWABG was formed in 2017; as of March 2022 it had 412 participants.

== Structure ==
The IWABG was formed in 2017 and is chaired by Wendy Seltzer. As of April 2021, it had 355 participants.

IWABG participants attend periodical conference calls and collaborate on GitHub.

== Googleʻs Privacy Sandbox initiative ==
In January 2020, Google encouraged advertising technology companies to join or contact the IWABG as a way to participate in the company's Privacy Sandbox initiative.

== Allegations of dominance by Google ==
Member organizations in the IWABG each get one vote, but can send any number of representatives to participate. As of October 2020, there were 258 participants in the group, of which 33 were Google employees. In August 2020, a group of IWABG members wrote an open letter to the advisory board of the World Wide Web Consortium (W3C), expressing concern that "a disparity in organizational size" was preventing the W3C from fulfilling its purpose of equally representing all web stakeholders.
