= The Future of the Internet and How to Stop It =

2008 book by Jonathan Zittrain

- Author: Jonathan Zittrain
- Language: English
- Subject: Internet; Internet -- social aspects Internet-- security measures
- Publisher: Yale University Press
- Publication date: 2008
- Publication place: United States
- Media type: Print (paperback, hardcover)
- Pages: vi, 342 p.
- ISBN: 978-0-300-12487-3

The Future of the Internet and How to Stop It is a book published in 2008 by Yale University Press and authored by Jonathan Zittrain. The book discusses several legal issues regarding the Internet.

The book is made available under the Creative Commons Attribution Non-Commercial Share-Alike 3.0 license.
