= Anonymous web browsing =

Anonymous web browsing may refer to one of the following:

- Private browsing
- Dark web
- Tor (network)
- I2P
