= Wikiwand =

Proprietary viewer interface for Wikipedia

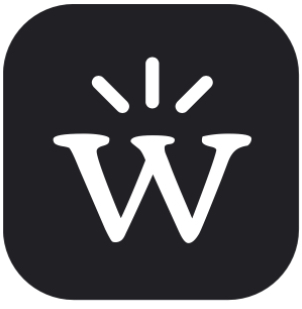
- Logo used since 2024

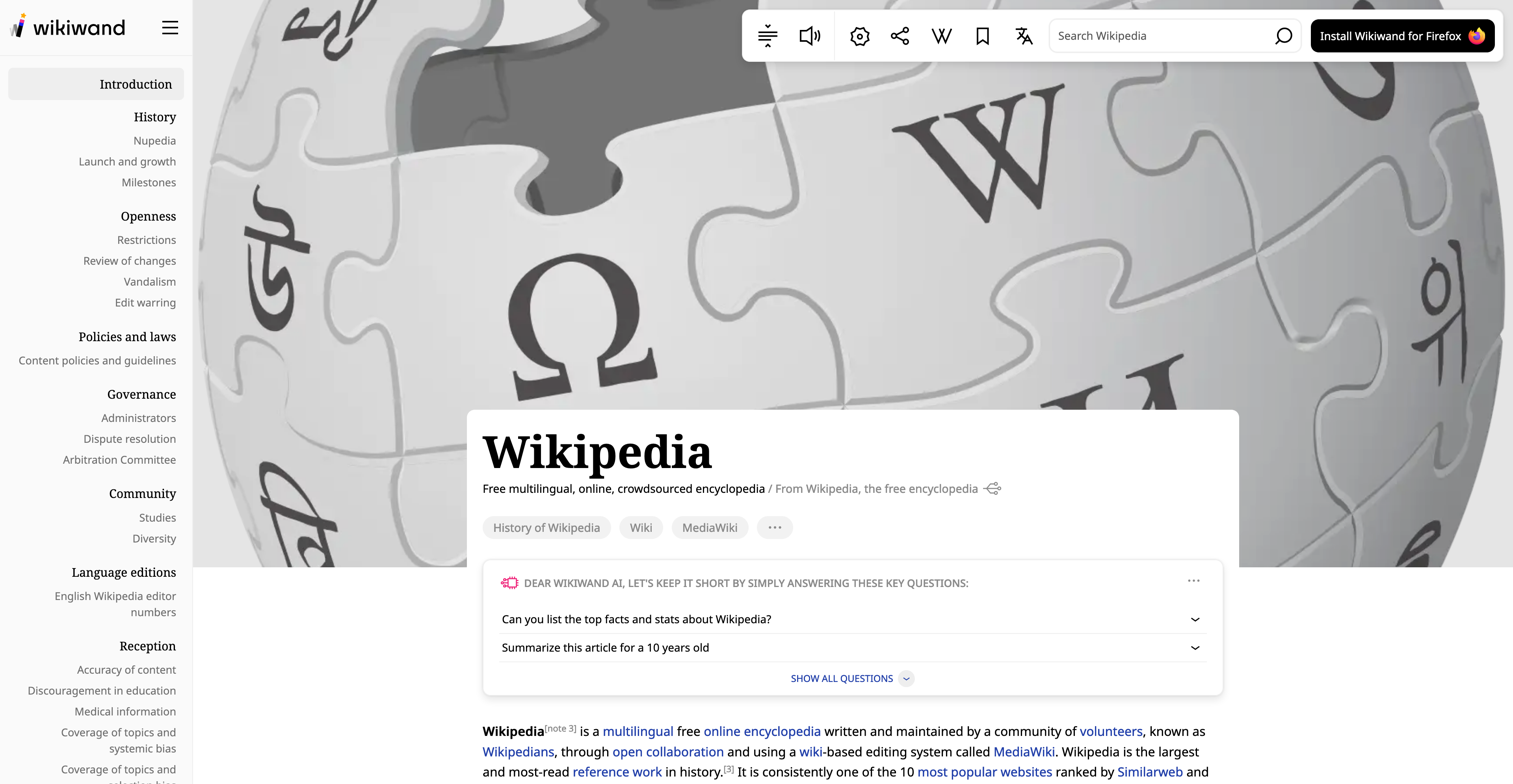
- Screenshot depicting Wikipedia's page in Wikiwand
- Company type: Privately held company
- Available in: English
- Headquarters: San Francisco, California
- Area served: Worldwide
- Founders: Lior Grossman, Ilan Lewin
- Chairperson: Saar Wilf
- CEO: Tomer Lener (2015 — present); Lior Grossman (2013 — 2015)
- Key people: Itay Cohen (COO)
- Employees: 10+
- Website: wikiwand.com
- Commercial: Yes
- Registration: Optional
- Launched: 2013
- Current status: Active

Wikiwand, formerly stylized as WikiWand, is a commercial proprietary interface developed by an Israeli company of the same name for viewing Wikipedia articles. Its interface includes a sidebar menu displaying the table of contents, a navigation bar, personalized links to other languages, new typography, access to previews of linked articles, display advertisements, and sponsored articles. The interface is available on Chrome, Firefox, and Microsoft Edge as well as via Wikiwand's website.

== History ==
Wikiwand was founded in 2013 by Lior Grossman and Ilan Lewin. It officially launched in August 2014. Currently, Ilan is the General Manager at Kineti B.V., a Netherlands-based company involved in military sensory applications, under the Cypriot parent company Cnext Solutions Ltd.

In 2014, Wikiwand was able to raise $600,000 to support the development of the interface. According to Grossman, "It didn't make sense to us that the fifth most popular website in the world, used by half a billion people, has an interface that hasn't been updated in over a decade. We found the Wikipedia interface cluttered, hard to read, hard to navigate, and lacking in terms of usability."

In March 2015, Wikiwand released an iOS app for iPhone and iPad.

In February 2020, an Android app was under development.

In 2021, it was noted that visiting a Wikiwand page made the visitor's device exchange hundreds of requests and several megabytes of data with advertisers.

On January 12, 2023, Wikiwand 2.0 was officially launched with an overhauled interface and new features like text-to-speech and AI-generated summaries collaborated with Wordtune Read. On March 1, a Q&A feature powered by GPT-3 was added to the top of all articles.

== Business model ==
Unlike Wikipedia, Wikiwand is ad-supported. It employs a freemium model that charges for a premium, ad-free plan. A large number of tracking cookies are set. When it started, Wikiwand claimed that it would donate 30 percent of its profits to the Wikimedia Foundation, though as of 2024, it was only applying this policy to user donations, not to subscription or advertising revenue. Per the site's Donation page, donations to Wikiwand are made to the Israeli company Wikipele Ltd.

As of January 24, 2026, Wikiwand was still advertising itself as a 'leading donor' to the Wikimedia Foundation, but neither Wikiwand or Wikipele Ltd. are listed in the Wikimedia Foundation's 'Benefactors' list.
