= Lumen (website) =

Database of online legal complaints

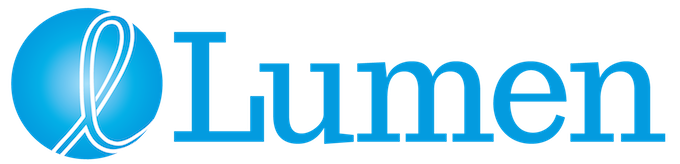
- Logo since 2015
- Available in: English
- Founded: 2001
- Headquarters: Cambridge, Massachusetts, United States
- Creator: Wendy Seltzer
- Website: lumendatabase.org

Lumen, formerly Chilling Effects, is an American collaborative archive created by Wendy Seltzer and operated by the Berkman Klein Center for Internet & Society at Harvard University. It allows recipients of cease-and-desist notices to submit them to the site and receive information about their legal rights and responsibilities.

The archive was founded in 2001 with several law school clinics and the Electronic Frontier Foundation to protect lawful online activity from legal threats. Originally located in San Francisco, California, Lumen later moved its operations to Massachusetts.

== Inception ==
Original logo until 2015

The archive was founded in 2001 by Internet activists who were concerned that the unregulated private practice of sending cease-and-desist letters seemed to be increasing and was having an unstudied, but potentially significant, "chilling effect" on free speech.

The archive got a boost when Google began submitting its notices to the site in 2002. Google began to do so in response when the Church of Scientology convinced Google to remove references and links to an anti-Scientology web site, Operation Clambake, in April 2002. The incident inspired vocal Internet users and groups to complain to Google, and links to the Clambake site were restored. Google subsequently began to contribute its notices to Chilling Effects, archiving the Scientology complaints and linking to the archive.

Starting in 2002, researchers used the clearinghouse to study the use of cease-and-desist letters, primarily looking at Digital Millennium Copyright Act (DMCA) 512 takedown notices, non-DMCA copyright issues, and trademark claims.

On November 2, 2015, Chilling Effects announced its renaming to Lumen, as well as a number of international partnerships.

== Reception ==
Lumen has been praised for providing and promoting transparency on the use of copyright takedowns.

The Copyright Alliance has criticized Lumen for republishing lists of URLs named in takedowns as part of its database. It argued that this defeats the purpose and intent of sending takedown notices to search engines in the first place, as they would subsequently be added to "the largest repository of URLs hosting infringing content on the internet.". While the Lumen database formerly used to show full URLs, in 2019 the URLs were redacted to only display the website names and the number of URLs from each site, with the full URLs only to be made available to authorised users.

== Members or past members ==
- Berkman Center for Internet and Society, Harvard Law School
- Electronic Frontier Foundation
- George Washington University Law School
- Samuelson Law, Technology and Public Policy Clinic, Boalt Hall
- Santa Clara University School of Law High Tech Law Institute
- Stanford Center for Internet and Society, Stanford Law School
- University of Maine School of Law
- IIP Justice Project, University of San Francisco School of Law

== See also ==
- Censorship by Google
