= Wendy Seltzer =

American attorney

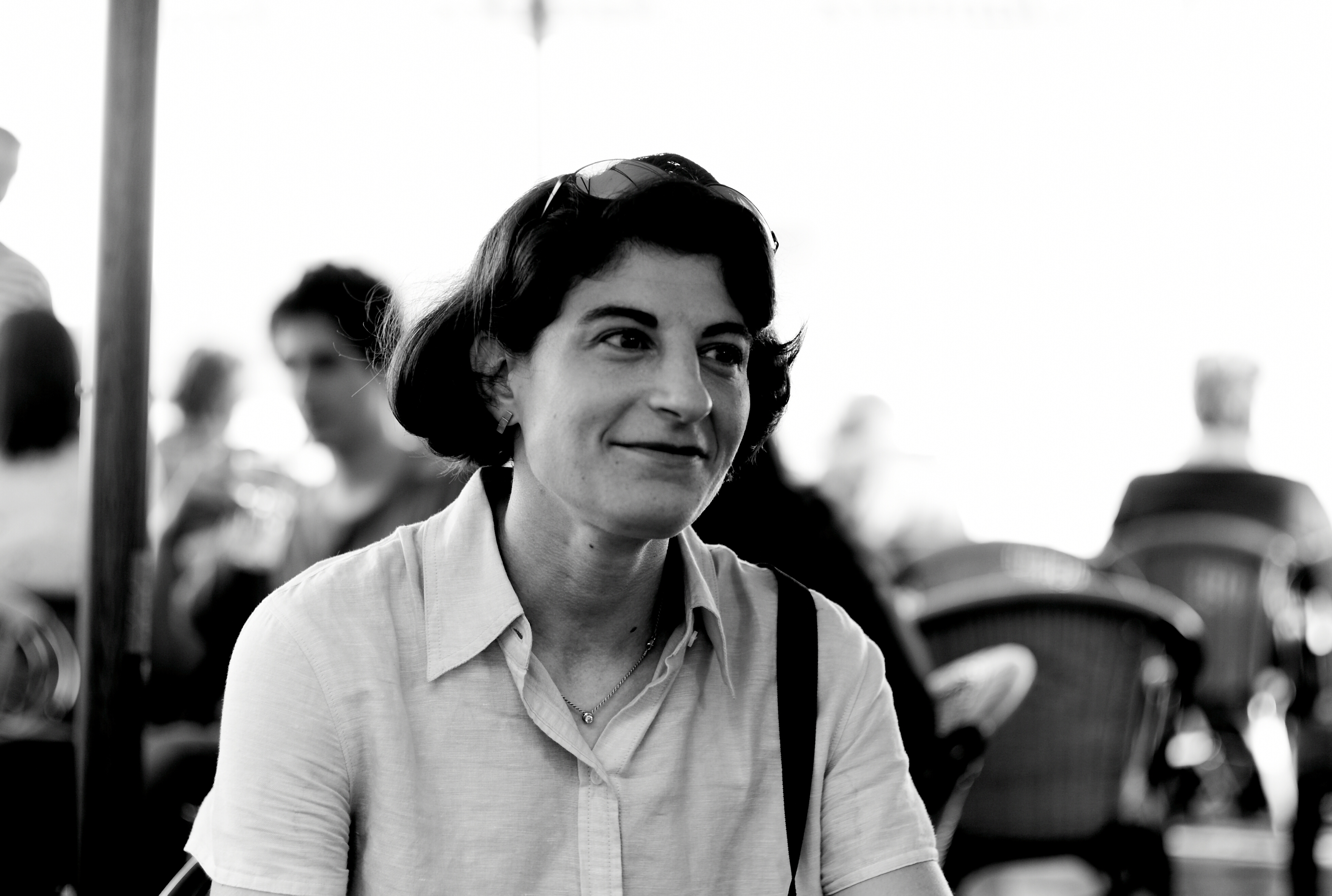
- At the iCommons meeting in Dubrovnik 2007
- Education: Harvard College (BA); Harvard Law School (JD)
- Organization: W3C
- Website: wendy.seltzer.org

Wendy Seltzer is an American attorney and, as of January 2023, a staff member at Tucows where she is the Principal Identity Architect. She is known for her many years of work with the World Wide Web Consortium, where, among many roles, she was the chair of the Improving Web Advertising Business Group.

Seltzer is also a Fellow with Harvard's Berkman Center for Internet & Society, where she founded the Lumen clearinghouse, which is aimed at helping Internet users to understand their rights in response to cease-and-desist threats related to intellectual property and other legal demands.

In the past, Seltzer served on the board of directors of the World Wide Web Foundation. A former At-large Liaison to the ICANN board of directors, she has advocated for increased transparency of the organization of, and for increased protection of, the privacy of Internet users. From April to July 2007, she was a Visiting Fellow at the Oxford Internet Institute.

Previously she was with Princeton's Center for Information Technology Policy and was a visiting assistant professor at the Northeastern University School of Law and Brooklyn Law School, as well as a fellow at the Information Society Project at Yale Law School, and served on the board of directors of the Tor Project. Before that, she was a staff attorney with the Electronic Frontier Foundation, specializing in intellectual property and free speech issues.

Seltzer has an A.B. from Harvard College ( and a J.D. from Harvard Law School (1999). In 2007, she was the Visiting Fellow with the Oxford Internet Institute.

== Publications ==
- "EFF Members Build Liberated TVs." Deeplinks (May 23, 2005). Electronic Frontier Foundation.
- "Free speech unmoored in copyright's safe harbor: Chilling effects of the DMCA on the first amendment", Harv. JL & Tech 2010
- Abelson, Harold, et al. Blown to Bits: Your Life, Liberty, and Happiness after the Digital Explosion. 2nd ed., Addison-Wesley Professional, 2021.
