= User agent =

Software acting on behalf of a user

On the Web, a user agent is a software agent responsible for retrieving and facilitating end-user interaction with Web content. This includes all web browsers, such as Google Chrome and Safari, some email clients, standalone download managers like youtube-dl, and other command-line utilities like cURL.

The user agent is the client in a client–server system. The HTTP User-Agent header is intended to clearly identify the agent to the server. However, this header can be omitted or spoofed, so some websites use other detection methods.
