= Smart speaker industry in South Korea =

Smart speakers, or AI speakers, have been developed by multiple domestic electronics and telecommunications firms in South Korea. Since their introduction to the local market in 2016, they have been used by millions of people in the country.

== Brands ==
=== Google ===
In September 2018, Google Home (including the Google Home Mini) launched in South Korea. Running Google Assistant, it featured simultaneous recognition of two languages among a total of seven, including Korean. At launch, it could play music from Bugs!, in addition to YouTube.

=== Kakao ===
In November 2017, Kakao launched the Kakao Mini, featuring integrated KakaoTalk functionality.

=== KT ===
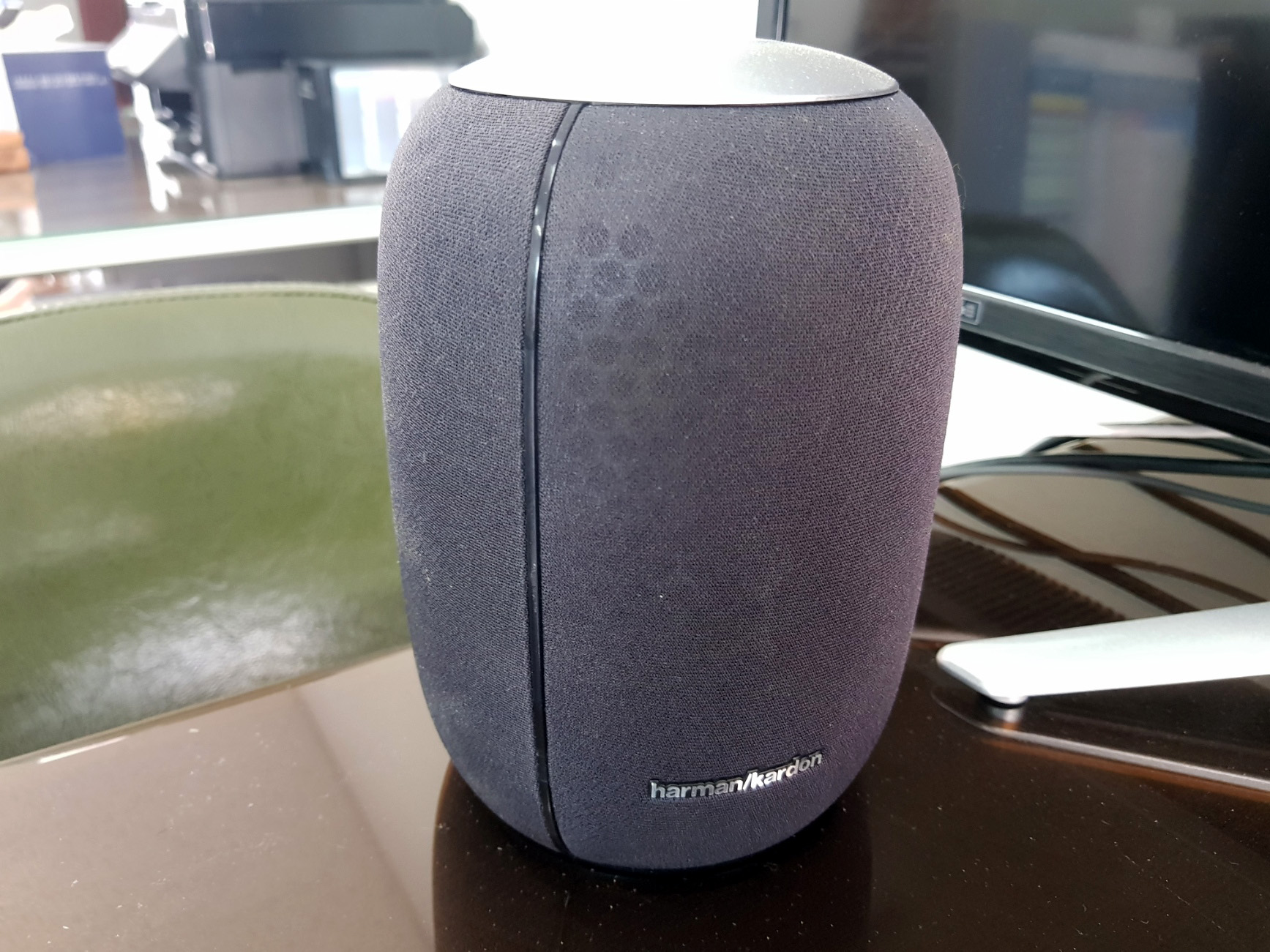
KT GiGa Genie 2

KT launched the GiGA Genie smart speaker in January 2017, using a Harman Kardon speaker. In November 2017, KT announced GiGA Genie LTE, a portable AI speaker with LTE support. They also released a mini speaker called GiGA Genie Buddy. In 2018, KT created a special version of GiGa Genie with a screen for use in hotels. On 29 April 2019, KT announced the GiGA Genie Table TV, a consumer-oriented smart speaker with a display. It featured paid TV access through Wi-Fi. Based on usage data from the hotel model, KT decided not to add a touchscreen. The Table TV also featured a limited-access "personalized-text-to-speech technology" which could use parents' voice recording inputs to read children books. In February 2022, KT began rolling out Amazon Alexa integration into its speakers for English support.

=== Naver ===
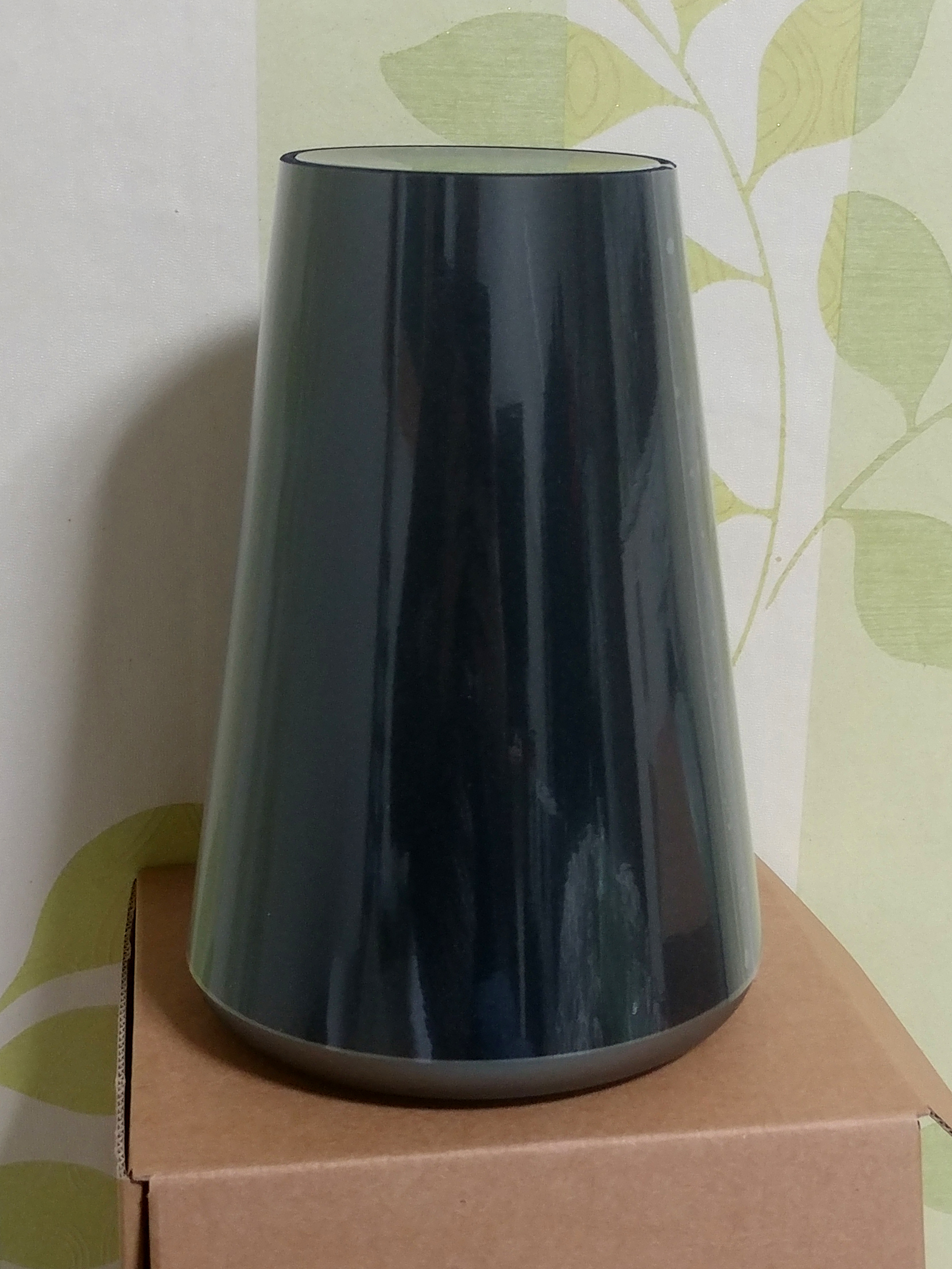
Naver Wave speaker

In August 2017, Naver announced the Wave smart speaker, operating on Clova. In October 2017, Naver launched the Friends smart speaker, which were designed based on Line characters.

==== LG Uplus ====
In December 2017, LG Uplus launched the Friends+ speaker with Naver, operating on U+ Home AI.

=== Samsung ===
In August 2018, Samsung announced the Samsung Galaxy Home in partnership with Spotify. The original size was delayed, while the Galaxy Home Mini appeared briefly as a bonus for Samsung Galaxy S20 preorders in South Korea in February 2020.

=== SK Telecom ===
SK Telecom launched the Nugu smart speaker in September 2016, using an Astell & Kern audio system. In August 2017, SKT released a portable speaker named Nugu mini. In July 2018, SKT launched the Nugu Candle, featuring expanded mood lighting. The first-generation Nugu was subsequently discontinued. On 18 April 2019, SKT released the NUGU Nemo AI, which featured a display and JBL stereo speaker. In August 2019, SKT collaborated with SM Entertainment, incorporating functions related to the agency's artists into Nugu. In January 2022, SKT showcased the NUGU Candle SE, introducing Alexa support.

== Usage ==
KT GiGa Genie command data by subject (2017-2018)
1. TV (35.0%)
2. conversational (15.0%)
3. music (13.0%)
4. home appliances (12.0%)
5. recommendations, web search, weather, time, etc. (25.0%)

In 2018, approximately 3 million people in South Korea used smart speakers.

According to data from KT in 2018, the most common commands to its speakers were for controlling televisions. Based on a broader survey in 2017, music was selected as the most frequent use case.

Smart speaker function usage
| Function | % |
|---|---|
| Music | 71.3 |
| Weather/traffic | 41 |
| Internet searches | 40.3 |
| Timer | 35.7 |
Korea Consumer Agency survey of 300 users (2017)

By 2018, smart speaker companies were partnering with reading and other education services, adding potential use-cases for children.

By 2022, smart speakers were being utilized by the South Korean government. SKT, in partnership with 70 regional governments, distributed smart speakers to 12,000 senior citizens living alone. The government paid for monthly subscriptions to help seniors stay mentally engaged. Naver made an agreement with the Seoul Metropolitan Government to provide Clova CareCall, an automated health checkup program to hundreds of senior citizens living alone. KT's AI care service included an emergency dispatch call function and medication notifications.

== Criticism ==
=== Communication ===
In a survey of 300 users in 2017, approximately half reported having some type of communication issue with their smart speakers.

=== Privacy ===
South Korean smart speakers sparked privacy concerns when they were found to be collecting and documenting user audio data in 2019. The speaker companies responded that only a minority of data was collected and that it was anonymized. They stated that such recordings were collected for performance improvements.
