= Perplexity AI =

American artificial intelligence company

Perplexity AI, Inc.
- Logo
- Trade name: Perplexity
- Type: Privately held company
- Industry: Artificial intelligence, search engine
- Founded: 22 August 2022; 4 years ago
- Founders: Aravind Srinivas, Denis Yarats, Johnny Ho, Andy Konwinski
- Headquarters: San Francisco, California, U.S.
- Area served: Worldwide
- Products: Perplexity; Perplexity Pro; Perplexity Assistant; Perplexity Computer; Perplexity Comet
- Number of employees: 52 (2024)
- Website: perplexity.ai

Perplexity AI, Inc., or simply Perplexity, is an American privately held software company offering a web search engine that processes user queries and synthesizes responses. Perplexity products use large language models and include web search capabilities which provide responses based on current Internet content, citing sources used. A free public version is available, while a paid Pro subscription offers access to more advanced language models and additional features.

Perplexity AI, Inc., was founded in 22 August 2022 by Aravind Srinivas, Denis Yarats, Johnny Ho, and Andy Konwinski. As of September 2025, the company was valued at US$20 billion.

Perplexity AI has faced legal scrutiny over allegations of copyright infringement, unauthorized use of content, and trademark issues from several major media organizations, including the BBC, Dow Jones, and The New York Times. According to separate analyses by Wired and, later, Cloudflare, Perplexity uses undisclosed web crawlers with spoofed user-agent strings to scrape the content of websites that prohibit or explicitly block web scraping.

== History ==
In August 2022, Perplexity AI, Inc., was founded by Aravind Srinivas, Denis Yarats, Johnny Ho, and Andy Konwinski, engineers with backgrounds in back-end systems, artificial intelligence (AI), and machine learning. It launched its main search engine on December 7, 2022, and has since released a Google Chrome extension and apps for iOS and Android. In February 2023, Perplexity reported two million unique visitors. By April 2024, Perplexity has raised $165 million in funding, which values the company at over $1 billion. As of June 2025, Perplexity closed a $500 million funding round, elevating its valuation to $14 billion. Investors in Perplexity AI have included Jeff Bezos, Tobias Lütke, Nat Friedman, Nvidia, and Databricks. Additionally, Perplexity has received funding from 1789 Capital, a venture capital firm notable for its association with Donald Trump Jr.

In July 2024, Perplexity announced the launch of a new publishers' program to share advertising revenue with partners. On January 18, 2025, the day before the impending U.S. ban on the social media app TikTok, Perplexity submitted a proposal for a merger with TikTok US. On August 12, 2025, Perplexity made a bid to purchase Chrome from Google for $34.5 billion. Perplexity stated that the sale could remedy antitrust litigation against Google, in which a judge was considering compelling the sale of Chrome. In December 2025, Cristiano Ronaldo took a undisclosed stake in Perplexity AI and entered a global brand partnership with the company.

As of early 2026, Perplexity AI reached a valuation of $21.21 billion following its Series E-6 funding round. In January 2026, the company signed a three-year, $750 million agreement with Microsoft to use its Azure cloud and its Foundry service, giving Perplexity access to models from OpenAI, Anthropic and xAI. Amazon Web Services remained its main cloud provider.

In February 2026, Perplexity transitioned to a subscription-first model by discontinuing its AI-integrated advertising strategy. Leadership stated this move was intended to preserve user trust in the "answer engine," prioritizing objective results over ad revenue.

== Products and services ==
Perplexity AI

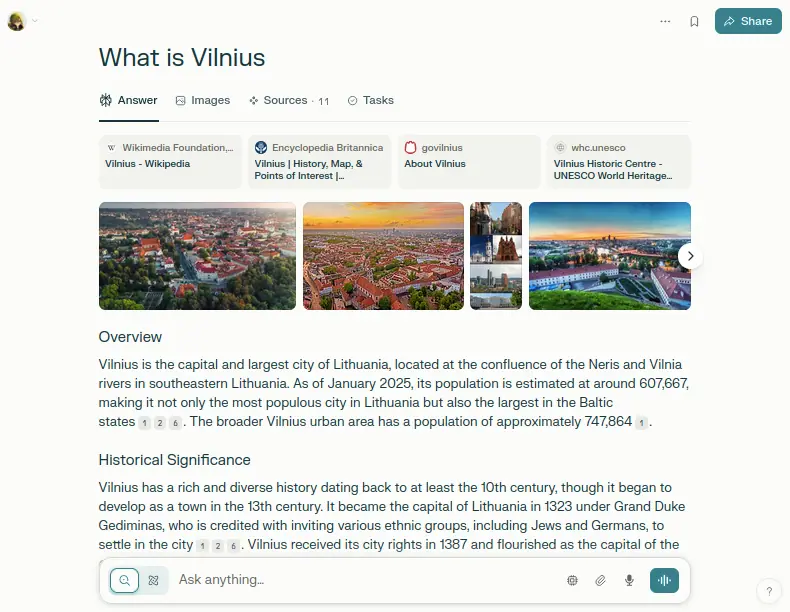
- Screenshot of Perplexity AI answer to "What is Vilnius" prompt
- Developers: Aravind Srinivas; Denis Yarats; Johnny Ho; Andy Konwinski
- Release: December 7, 2022; 3 years ago
- Engine: GPT-5.5; Claude Opus 4.7; Gemini 3.1 Pro; Kimi K2.6; Sonar 2
- Type: Search engine; Large language model; Generative pre-trained transformer
- Website: perplexity.ai

=== Search engine web portal ===
Perplexity's primary offering is a search engine that uses large language models to generate responses to user queries by searching and summarizing web-based content. Perplexity is available to web users without charge or registration, a freemium model.

=== Perplexity Pro ===
Perplexity Pro is a subscription tier which includes stronger security and data protection and additional tools. It allows the user to select between backend models such as GPT-5.4, Claude 4.6, and Gemini 3.1 Pro. The company has also developed its own models, Sonar (based on Llama 3.3) and R1 1776 (based on DeepSeek R1).

=== Internal Knowledge Search ===
Internal Knowledge Search enables Pro and Enterprise Pro users to browse web content and their internal documents simultaneously. It also allows users to upload and search through files in Excel, Word, PDF, and other common file formats. Enterprise Pro users can upload and index up to 500 files.

=== Search API ===
Perplexity's Search API provides AI developers with programmatic access to the company's search infrastructure.

=== Shopping hub ===
Perplexity's Shopping Hub is an online shopping platform that generates product recommendations and enables users to purchase products directly through Perplexity's interface. It was launched in November 2024 with backing by Amazon and Nvidia.

=== Finance ===
In October 2024, Perplexity AI launched new finance-focused features, such as software that tracks stock prices and company earnings data, and basic financial analysis tools. The platform sources its financial data from Financial Modelling Prep.

=== Assistant ===
In January 2025, Perplexity launched the Perplexity Assistant, an AI tool designed to improve its search engine's functionality. It can perform tasks such as using a rideshare app or searching for a song, and can maintain context across actions. The assistant can use a phone's camera to attempt to provide answers about the user's surroundings or on-screen content. Perplexity has said that the assistant is still in development and may not always function as expected. For instance, certain features, such as summarizing unread emails or upcoming calendar events, require users to enable a workaround based on notifications.

=== Comet ===
In July 2025, Perplexity launched Comet, an AI browser based on Chromium. Initially, access to the browser was limited to users subscribed to the most expensive subscription tier. The browser was later released for free download in October 2025. The browser integrates the Perplexity search engine.

=== Truth Social chatbot ===
Perplexity has been contracted to produce a chatbot for Donald Trump's social media platform Truth Social.

=== Perplexity Computer ===
In February 2026, Perplexity launched Perplexity Computer, a general-purpose AI agent designed to autonomously perform multi-step tasks using multiple large language models and specialized subagents.

In April 2026, Perplexity introduced Personal Computer, an extension of Computer designed to operate on a user's local device.

== Leadership ==
Aravind Srinivas is the CEO and co-founder of Perplexity AI. He previously held research positions at OpenAI, Google DeepMind, and other AI research institutions focusing on machine learning and artificial intelligence. In a March 2026 All-In episode, Srinivas said the incoming AI-related layoffs were a "glorious future" to "look forward" to, as it freed people from jobs they didn't like and gave them opportunities to pursue entrepreneurship.

== Controversies ==
=== Copyright and trademark infringement allegations ===
In June 2024, Forbes publicly criticized Perplexity for using their content. According to Forbes, Perplexity published a story largely copied from a proprietary Forbes article without mentioning or prominently citing Forbes. In response, Srinivas said that the feature had some "rough edges" and accepted feedback but maintained that Perplexity only "aggregates" rather than plagiarizes information.

In October 2024, The New York Times sent a cease-and-desist notice to Perplexity demanding that it stop accessing and using NYT content, claiming that Perplexity is violating its copyright by scraping data from its website. In June 2024, Dow Jones and New York Post filed a lawsuit against Perplexity, alleging copyright infringement. The lawsuit also alleged that Perplexity harmed their brand by attributing hallucinated quotes, for example, on F-16 jets for Ukraine, to articles that did not include them. On October 24, 2024, Perplexity AI published an official response on its company blog asserting that the claims in the lawsuits were misleading and stating it was open to revenue-sharing arrangements with content providers. On January 31, 2025, Perplexity was sued in the United States for alleged trademark infringement by Perplexity Solved Solutions (PSS), a software firm founded in 2017. The lawsuit claims that Perplexity AI's use of the name "Perplexity" violates PSS's federally registered trademark and could cause consumer confusion. PSS had previously declined an offer from Perplexity AI to purchase the trademark in 2023. The suit seeks to prevent Perplexity AI from using the name in its branding and marketing. In June 2025, UK broadcaster the BBC threatened legal action against Perplexity AI, demanding that the company stop the unauthorized scraping of its content, delete all retained BBC material used in training its models, and provide financial compensation for the infringement of its intellectual property rights. On August 8, 2025, the Japanese newspaper company Yomiuri Shimbun filed a lawsuit against Perplexity for "free-riding" use of 120,000 articles of the publication from February to June 2025. Later that month, two more Japanese newspaper companies, The Asahi Shimbun and The Nikkei, also sued the company for alleged copyright infringement.

In September 2025, Encyclopædia Britannica, Inc. and Merriam-Webster filed suit against Perplexity AI for alleged copyright and trademark infringement. The case concerns allegations that Perplexity copied copyrighted articles to generate responses to user queries and reproduce protected material in its search results. For that lawsuit, in September 2026, a federal court ordered Perplexity to produce additional data relating to its retrieval-augmented generation system and user activity logs. The court also addressed disputes over the production of historical source-code versions and other discovery materials.

In October 2025, Reddit sued Perplexity in federal court in New York, alleging that it and three other companies unlawfully scraped its data. In July 2026, a federal judge largely denied motions to dismiss the lawsuit, allowing claims against Perplexity under the Digital Millennium Copyright Act and a civil conspiracy claim under New York law to proceed.

In May 2026, CNN sued Perplexity in the United States District Court for the Southern District of New York, alleging that the company copied and distributed more than 17,000 CNN stories, videos, images and other works through its AI products. The complaint also alleged trademark infringement, including the false attribution of AI-generated errors to CNN. Perplexity responded that facts could not be copyrighted.

=== Stealth web crawlers ===
In June 2024, separate investigations by the magazine Wired and web developer Robb Knight found that Perplexity does not respect the Robot Exclusion Protocol (or robots.txt) standard, which may include requests for web crawlers to not scrape sections of the site's content, despite Perplexity claiming the opposite. While Perplexity publicly lists the IP address ranges and user agent strings of its web crawlers, Wired and Robb Knight claim that it uses undisclosed IP addresses and spoofed user agent strings when ignoring robots.txt. In response, Srinivas stated that Perplexity was not ignoring robots.txt, but suggested that it relied on third-party web crawlers that do. When asked, Srinivas declined to commit to cease scraping Wired content using third parties.

In August 2025, Cloudflare published research revealing that Perplexity was using undeclared "stealth" web crawlers to bypass web application firewalls intended to block Perplexity crawlers, and did not respect robots.txt files. Among others, Cloudflare's CEO Matthew Prince tweeted that Perplexity acts "more like North Korean hackers" than a reputable AI company. Perplexity publicly denied the claims, labeling them as a "charlatan publicity stunt."

== See also ==
- List of artificial intelligence companies
