= Supermium =

Free and open source web browser

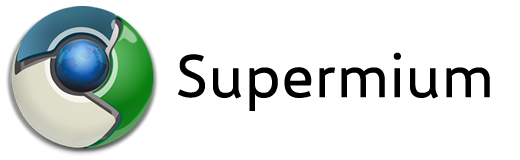

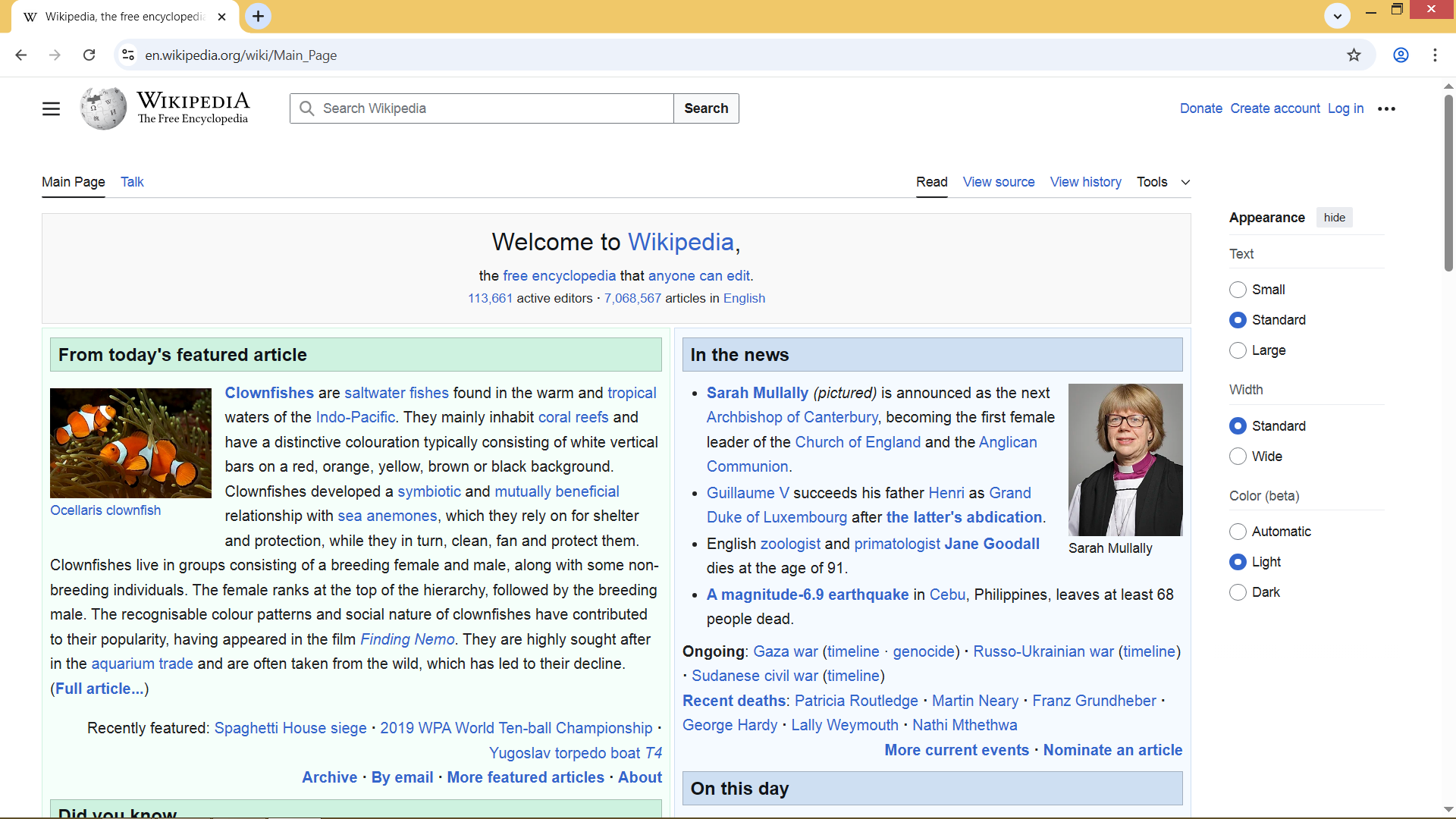
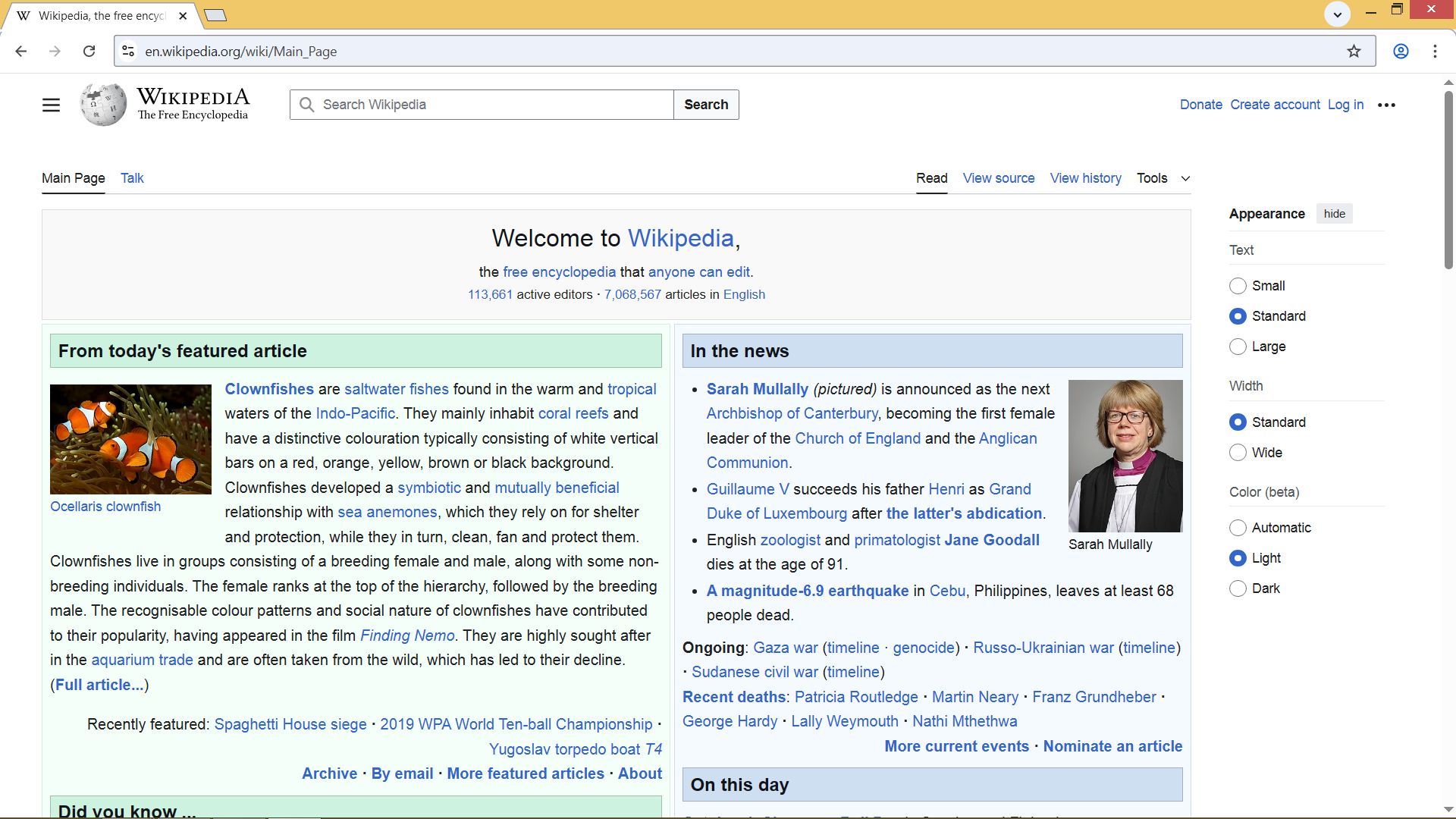
- Supermium running on Windows 8.1
- Original author: Shane Fournier
- Developers: Legacy Software Corporation, founded by Shane Fournier
- Release: 115.0.5744.0 (May 9, 2023; 3 years ago)
- Stable release: 150.0.7871.255 R2.01 / 21 October 2026
- Preview release: 150.0.7871.226 / 24 September 2026
- Written in: C++, Java, Objective-C++, TypeScript, HTML, Python and others
- Operating system: Windows XP SP1 or later Windows Server 2003 or later
- Platform: IA-32, x86-64
- Type: Web browser
- License: BSD-3-Clause
- Website: win32subsystem.live/supermium/
- Repository: github.com/win32ss/supermium

Supermium is a free and open-source web browser developed by Shane Fournier, with its first version being released in May 2023. It is a fork of Chromium with its main feature being support for older versions of Microsoft Windows that are no longer supported by Chromium-based browsers like Google Chrome; this includes all versions prior to Windows 10, starting with Windows XP.

Supermium has 32-bit and 64-bit executables. Its version numbers are parallel with Chromium's, and revisions of the same main version, like R4, are added to the version number.

== History ==
Supermium debuted in May 2023 to supersede the developer's previous approach to bring modern versions of Google Chrome and other modern software to Windows Vista. Initial efforts consisted of a collection of modified system binaries (bundled in an installable package called the Extended Kernel) that adds system functions in order to make the browser compatible with Vista. This approach reached its limit when Google dropped support for Chrome on versions of Windows earlier than Windows 10, with version 110 in February 2023. The initial goal centered on Vista became insufficient, which led to the creation of the Supermium project, and at the same time making new software and drivers compatible with older Windows versions led to the founding of the Legacy Software Corporation by Shane Fournier, the developer.

Initially, the objective of the first versions of Supermium were to bring back support for Windows 7, 8 and 8.1, and progressively add support for older versions of Windows as the project stabilizes, in descending order.

The first version published online, version 115.0.5744.0, based on Chromium 115, was released as a proof-of-concept for future versions, and to demonstrate the feasibility of such a project. This initial version of the browser runs on Windows 8 and later, though it can also run on Windows 7 and Windows Vista with the Extended Kernel with sandboxing features disabled.

Version 119 marks the arrival of the full support for Windows Vista, which no longer requires the presence of the Extended Kernel, as well as the initial efforts to add back support for XP, such as the re-implementation of the GDI rendering. Support for Windows XP was added in Version 121.

As the project progressed, some unique features started to arrive on Supermium. In parallel to the re-addition of Windows XP compatibility, Version 121 started to implement some appearance flags to give the browser the look of older Chromium versions, starting with trapezoidal-shaped tabs similar to those in Chromium versions prior to 67, and a compact UI option to get the proportions UI elements have in version 49. Those cosmetic features went a step farther in the subsequent v122 releases, with the additions of several flags to better replicate the classic look.

Version 132 introduced new features like a legacy sandbox to run Chromium's sandbox on systems older than Windows 10, a forced dark mode, a flag to run the browser with a command switch called --disable-gpu-driver-bug-workarounds which makes it possible for example to use hardware acceleration with older graphics cards, as well as a compact UI switch to reminiscent older Chrome versions, and a flag to change the UI.

== Features ==
Supermium includes features like the Google Sync service which even work on Windows XP, as well as multiple UI themes to make the browser reminiscent of older versions of Google Chrome, like the so called "trapezoidal tabs" or Google Chrome 109's UI. A unique feature is the possibility to change single elements of the browser's UI with so called layout constants in a text file called scs placed in %localappdata%\Supermium\User Data.

Supermium also includes several flags from the ungoogled-chromium project for users that have concerns about their privacy and to prevent connections to Google services. The developer plans to introduce features such as Windows 2000 support, WebGPU for D3D9 rendering, and support for Manifest v2 extensions in future versions.

== System requirements ==
Supermium is compatible with Windows XP Service Pack 1, Windows Server 2003 or later. It requires a 32-bit (IA-32) or 64-bit (x86-64) processor; the 32-bit version requires a processor with SSE2 support, while the 64-bit version requires SSE3 support. It also requires at least 768 megabytes of RAM. It has been reported to run on processors as old as the original Pentium 4 with SSE2.

Starting with version 144, Supermium requires Windows XP Service Pack 3 or Windows Server 2003 Service Pack 2 in order to run; Windows XP SP2, Server 2003 SP1 or earlier versions are no longer supported.

== Reception ==
In a positive review, Softpedia's Roberto Samir wrote, "Given how powerful nostalgia can be for those who grow tired of the rather sterile and minimalist design of nowadays' operating systems, a brief return to the past can be made easier with Supermium whenever internet browsing is part of the equation."

German IT blogger Guenter Born gives the browser also a positive review at his blog, by saying that "the browser starts extremely fast and also works under Windows 7", and comparing it to ungoogled-chromium by saying "[w]hat I liked (compared to Ungoogled) is the fact that Google is already preconfigured as a search engine."
