= JioSphere =

Web browser

JioSphere Browser (formerly JioPages) is a web browser developed by Jio Platforms, a subsidiary of Reliance Industries Limited, an Indian multinational conglomerate. The browser is designed to provide a localized and integrated internet browsing experience for users, particularly within the Jio digital ecosystem. It is available for multiple platforms, including mobile devices and smart TVs.

== History ==
JioSphere Browser was developed by Jio Platforms as part of its broader strategy to expand digital services and enhance internet accessibility. Initial versions of the browser were released for mobile devices and smart TVs, focusing on localized content delivery and regional language support.

In later updates, JioSphere adopted a Chromium based architecture, improving compatibility with modern web standards and performance. Subsequent releases introduced built-in privacy features, including ad and tracker blocking. As part of Jio's exploration of blockchain based digital initiatives, later versions of the browser incorporated support for JioCoin, a digital token associated with Jio's ecosystem. This integration enabled users to access or interact with JioCoin related services directly through the browser interface.
