= Naver Papago =

Multilingual machine translation service

- Part of screenshot of the lead section text of "역사" ("History") in Korean Wikipedia, translated from Korean into Japanese.
- Website type: Machine translation
- Owner: Naver Corporation
- Website: papago.naver.com
- Current status: Active

Naver Papago (Korean: 네이버 파파고), shortened to Papago and stylized as papago, is a multilingual machine translation cloud service provided by Naver Corporation. The name Papago comes from the Esperanto word for parrot, Esperanto being a constructed language.

== Features ==
Papago ended its trial phase and officially launched on July 19, 2017, with translation options. It was only available as a smartphone app but it has since launched its own website and has expanded to other languages.

From November 2019, Papago was changed to be available without Internet service.

In 2020, the image translation function was introduced, and text in photos can be translated directly.

== Main functions ==
- 1:1 Conversation Mode: An interactive translation, translated through speech recognition.
- Image Translation: The portion of a photo in a gallery or the characters in a newly photographed picture is specified and translated into text.

== Special functions ==
=== WSD screen ===
If a homonym is detected in a sentence to be translated, the translator presents various interpretations for a homograph found in an input sentence. Users can choose a specific meaning and receive the retranslated sentence associated with their selected sense. Each sense is represented as a clear image on the translation result screen.

=== Automatic conversion of exchange rate ===
Using real-time exchange rate information, the current exchange rate is calculated along with the translation result.

== Supported languages ==
The following languages are supported in Naver Papago:

- Arabic
- Chinese (Simplified)
- Chinese (Traditional)
- English
- French
- German
- Hindi (browser only)
- Indonesian
- Italian
- Japanese
- Korean
- Portuguese (browser only)
- Russian
- Spanish
- Thai
- Vietnamese

== See also ==
- Naver Dictionary
- Clova (virtual assistant)
- Naver Whale
