= ChatGPT Atlas =

AI web browser developed by OpenAI

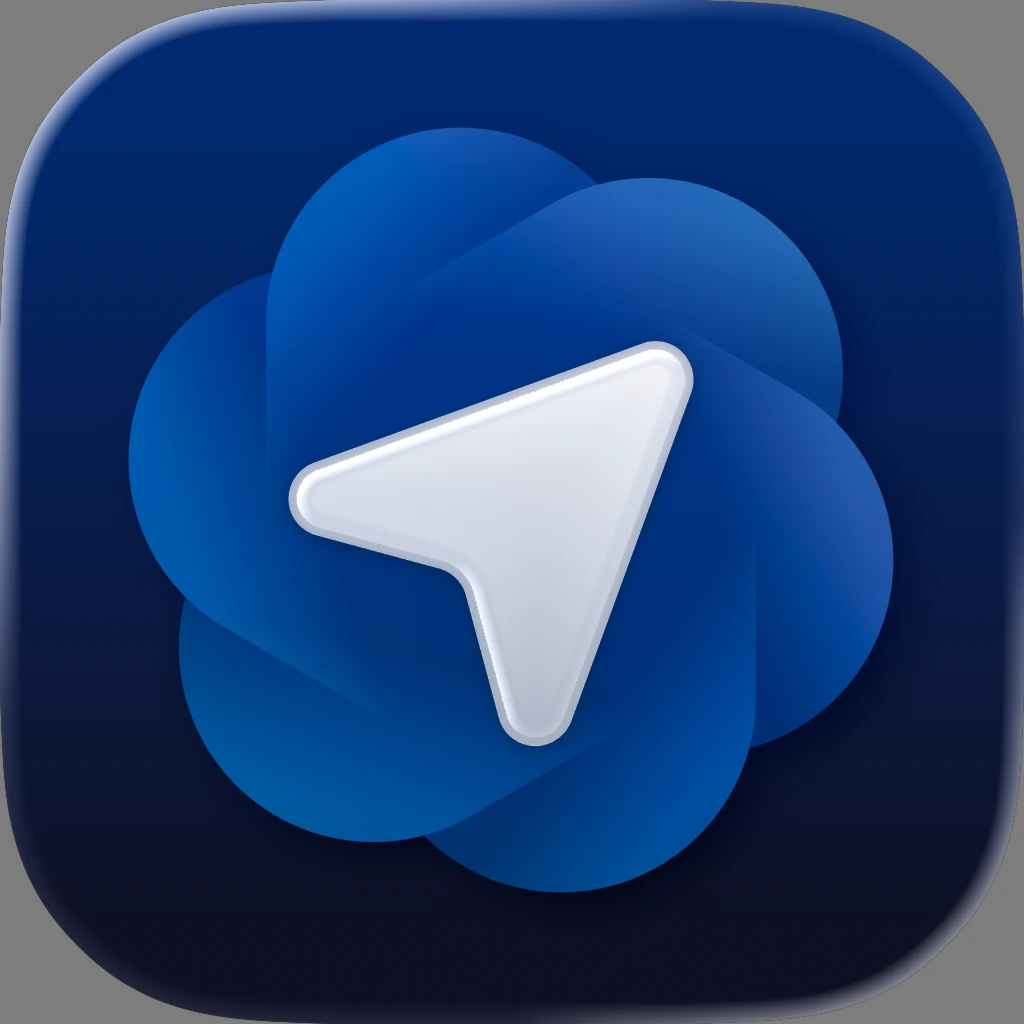
- Icon

- Developer: OpenAI
- Release: macOS: October 21, 2025; 12 months ago
- Engine: Blink
- License: Proprietary software, based on an open source project
- Website: chatgpt.com/atlas

ChatGPT Atlas is a discontinued AI browser developed by OpenAI. It was based on Chromium and was only available on macOS. The browser integrates ChatGPT into the browsing interface via a sidebar assistant that can answer questions about the current page, summarize content, and rewrite selected text. It uses a freemium model, with some capabilities (including an optional "agent mode" that can carry out tasks on websites) reserved for paid plans, and has drawn criticism over its effect on links to the open web and over reported security vulnerabilities involving its memory features. ChatGPT Atlas, the ChatGPT app, and OpenAI Codex was combined into one desktop application.

== History ==
On October 21, 2025, OpenAI announced ChatGPT Atlas and released it for macOS. The announcement stated that versions for Windows, iOS, and Android were coming soon.

The initial macOS rollout places the browser in a position to compete with established browsers like Google Chrome, Safari, and Microsoft Edge. The browser was introduced shortly after the release of Comet by Perplexity AI.

Reporting on the launch, the Associated Press described Atlas as an effort to make ChatGPT a gateway for web searches, and said the shift could reduce referrals to online publishers by keeping users inside AI-generated summaries. The AP also connected the debut to U.S. antitrust scrutiny of Google, noting that an OpenAI executive had previously said the company would be interested in acquiring Chrome if a court required it to be sold. The report also pointed to broader concerns about the reliability of AI-generated summaries, citing a European Broadcasting Union study that found nearly half of sampled answers from several leading AI assistants to news-related questions were flawed.

Built on the Chromium open source project, ChatGPT Atlas integrates ChatGPT directly into the browsing interface via a sidebar assistant that can summarize page content, compare products, and analyze information from websites. Paid users can enable an optional "agent mode" that allows ChatGPT to interact with websites to complete tasks on the user's behalf. The Verge reported that Atlas can also rewrite selected text in-line (a feature it calls "cursor chat").

The browser operates on a freemium model, providing a free version alongside paid subscriptions, with certain advanced features, such as the agent mode, available only to Plus and Pro subscribers.

In March 2026, OpenAI announced they would combine ChatGPT Atlas, the ChatGPT application for computers, and Codex into one desktop application.

On August 9, 2026, ChatGPT Atlas officially shut down.

== Features ==
ChatGPT Atlas features a ChatGPT sidebar within the browser that allows users to ask questions about the current webpage, summarize information, compare products, and analyze data from any site.

ChatGPT Atlas was only made available on macOS.

In November 2025, The Verge reported that OpenAI updated Atlas with optional vertical tabs in a resizable left-hand sidebar, allowing users to reorder tabs and select and drag multiple tabs at once. The update also added support for iCloud Keychain passkeys and the option to set Google as the default search engine; the Verge reported that Atlas could import extensions during initial setup for new installations, but that the feature was not yet available to existing users.

In January 2026, OpenAI added tab groups, allowing users to organize related pages together. The same update introduced an "Auto" search mode that switches between ChatGPT-generated answers and Google Search results depending on the query, and changed the presentation of links in answers to make external search links more prominent. The update also allows users to install iCloud's password extension when importing browser data from Safari.

The "browser memories" feature allows ChatGPT to remember facts and insights from visited sites to provide context, subject to user privacy controls. OpenAI has stated that "browser memories" are held on its servers for 30 days and are deleted afterward, and that user data would only be disclosed via "valid" legal processes or in an "emergency situation". OpenAI later said that Atlas includes separate controls for browser memories and for whether browsed web content may be used to train its models; the "include web browsing" training setting is off by default, and Business and Enterprise content is not used for training. The same help documentation states that, when browser memories are enabled, web content is summarized on OpenAI's servers, the original web contents are deleted immediately after summarization, and the privacy-filtered summaries are deleted within seven days.

=== Agent mode ===
The browser includes an optional agent mode for premium subscribers. It gives the AI a cursor and highlights the browser UI in blue, allowing it to perform tasks such as booking hotels and creating documents.

== Criticism ==
Anil Dash has called it an "anti-web browser", stating that it "actively fights against the web". He noted that it "substitutes its own AI-generated content for the web, but it looks like it's showing you the web", and described how, when he typed "Taylor Swift" into the search box, "the results had literally zero links to Taylor Swift's actual website". He emphasized that "all of these shortcomings are not because the browser is new and has bugs; this is the app working as designed." He further assessed Atlas's command-line interface as "worse in every conceivable way" than standard web browsers, and castigated its effect on online privacy.

Axios reported that Atlas raised privacy and security concerns because its agent and memory features require it to gather and remember more about users than traditional web browsers. The report added that this broader access could increase the risks posed by prompt injection attacks, since a malicious webpage might try to manipulate the browser into taking actions on a user's behalf.

In October 2025, cybersecurity firm LayerX Security reported a vulnerability in OpenAI's ChatGPT Atlas browser that it dubbed "ChatGPT Tainted Memories." LayerX said the attack relied on social engineering (tricking a logged-in user into clicking a malicious link), after which a compromised webpage could use a cross-site request forgery (CSRF) request to inject hidden instructions into ChatGPT's memory feature without the user's knowledge; LayerX said the injected instructions could persist across sessions and devices and influence later interactions with ChatGPT. The firm said it had disclosed the issue to OpenAI and criticized Atlas's anti-phishing protections at the time. An OpenAI spokesperson told CSO Online that the company had been unable to reproduce the reported CSRF attack, said it did not believe Atlas was vulnerable to it, and said it had not seen evidence of real-world attempts to exploit it.

== See also ==
- History of web browsers
- List of web browsers
