= Line Friends =

Characters and line of merchandise by South Korean artist Kang Byeong Mok

- Type: Characters
- Inventor: Kang Byeong Mok (South Korean designer)
- Inception: 2011
- Manufacturer: Naver Corporation; IPX Corporation
- Available: Yes
- Website: www.linefriends.com

Line Friends (Korean: 라인프렌즈, stylized in all caps) are featured characters, invented by South Korean designer Kang Byeong Mok, based on the stickers from diverse applications of the South Korean internet search giant Naver Corporation and the Korean messaging app Line.

== History ==
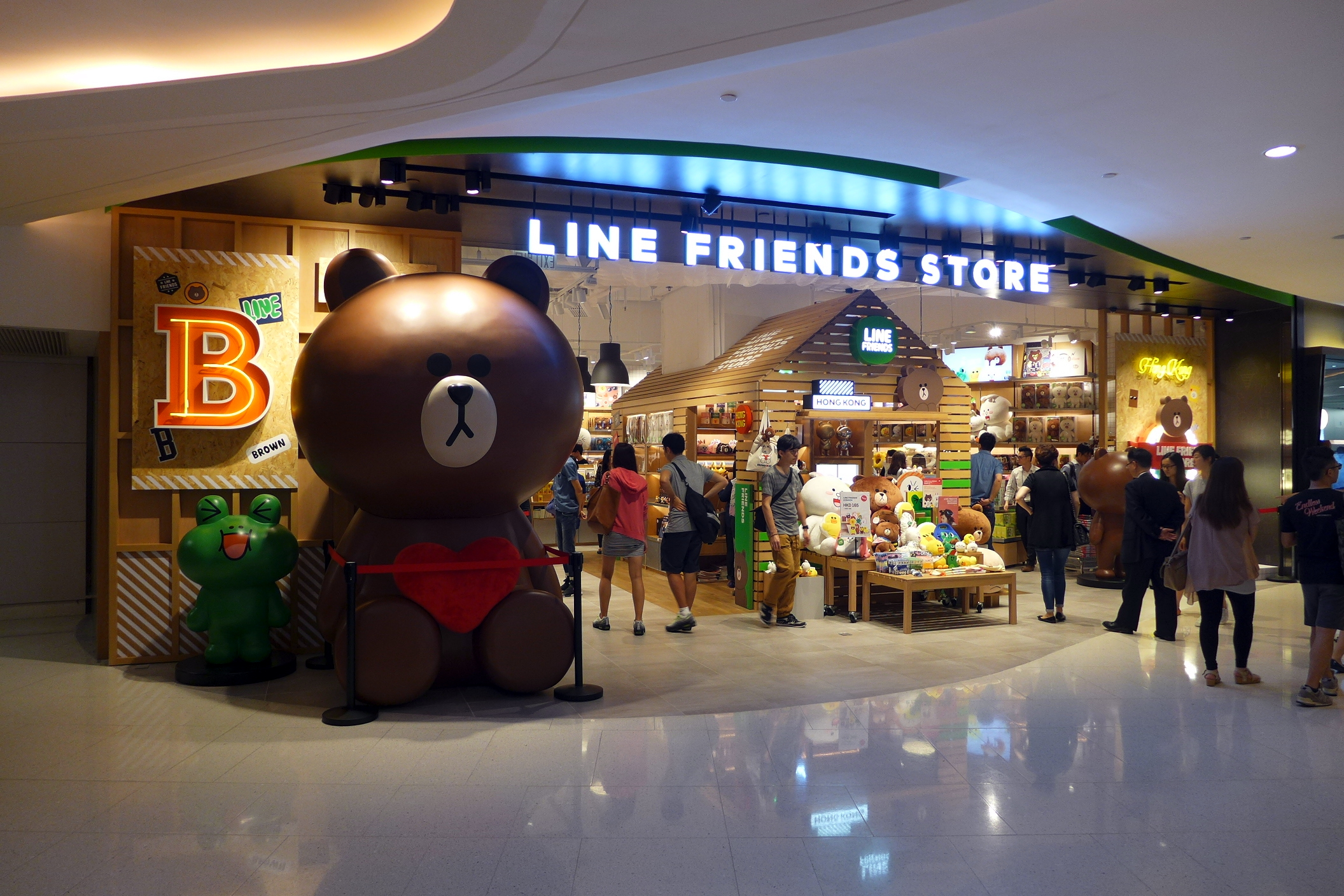
Line Friends Store in Hysan Place, Hong Kong

In January 2015, in order to further enhance the character brand value, the independent business LINE FRIENDS International Cartoon Image Brand Company was established, which is a subsidiary of NAVER.

LINE FRIENDS has so far launched various cooperative products with international brands around the world in more than 5,000 character products, animations, games, cafes, restaurants, theme parks and other fields, and has launched various cooperative products in New York, Los Angeles, Tokyo, Chengdu and Nanjing.

In addition to the 11 popular characters that LINE stickers currently have, LINE FRIENDS' latest project "FRIENDS CREATORS" has jointly launched a new series of cartoon images with Korean idol group BTS and Chinese idol Wang Yuan.

Currently, there are four series of cartoon characters: BT21, ROY6, WDZY and TRUZ.

The brand has currently managed by its subsidiary Line Friends Corporation since 2015.

== Characters ==
=== Brown and Friends ===
The original Line characters were created by South Korean designer Kang Byeongmok, also known as "Mogi" in 2011.

| Character | Timeline | Description | Reference |
|---|---|---|---|
| Cony | 2011 | She is bright, cheerful, and full of passion. She gets super excited when she's with her beloved Brown. Cony's always curious and likes challenging new things, so she often makes her friends. | |
| Brown | 2011 | Silent but has a warm heart. His expressionless face is charming, as a friend of everyone who expresses his mind more than words. He seems he doesn't care much. But, he has a shoulder to share and has a big heart to hear you. He loves Cony who is full of energy, and always there for his little sister Choco. | |
| Moon | 2011 | A funny guy whose face looks just like the full moon. No one knows where he came from, but he brings cheerful laughter to his friends with his wit and great humor. | |
| James | 2011 | Beautiful blonde-haired James who loves himself the most. He may seem cool and chic, but to tell the truth, he's delicate and fragile. | |
| Boss | 2013 | Loud and wild Boss is an ordinary salaryman. He shows up out of nowhere and gives good laughs to people. | |
| Jessica | 2013 | Smart and sassy Jessica. She always gives clear and punchy answers to friends who want to chat about things. | |
| Sally | 2013 | With her unexpected charm, cute little Sally brings joy to her friends full of bright and wild ideas. Don't be fooled by her cuteness, she might reveal the other side of her you've never expected! | |
| Leonard | 2014 | Sentimental Leonard likes to sing along with the sound of rain. He also loves to hang out with Sally and Edward, the so-called tiny little trio. | |
| Edward | 2014 | Edward is brilliant and always curious. He's also a racer who has a thirst for speed and an adventurer who dreams of the day becoming a butterfly! | |
| Choco | 2016 | Sweet, lovely Choco who loves fashion and sweets. She is shy like her brother Brown, but once you get to know her, she gets along well even with Brown's friends. | |
| Pangyo | 2016 | Our sluggish friend Pangyo, who likes to think and make interesting stuff. He is always content and has a smile on his face. | |
| Elly | 2020 | Sally's friends | |
| Louie | 2020 | Sally's friends | |
| Ari | 2020 | Sally's friends | |

=== BT21 ===
Logo of the BT21 series

BT21 is the first presentation from FRIENDS CREATORS, a project formed to create new characters for the Line Friends series.

Popular South Korean boy group BTS was the first artist of this project, and the main theme of the project is to show the connection between BTS and Line Friends in terms of popularity in the world. It comprises eight special characters designed by BTS, with seven characters representing individual BTS members and one character representing their fans, "Army".

The character designs were based on original ideas and sketches by the group's members. Videos of BTS designing BT21 were uploaded to the official BT21 channel on YouTube.

The name "BT21" is a combination of the group's name BTS and the 21st century. Member Suga commented that the name should represent both BTS and the 21st century, so they would live for the next 100 years.

BT21 was officially launched by Line Friends in October 2017.

In 2023, IPX Corporation had the rights to BT21, while Line Friends had less than before. Owned the rights to BT21, while Line Friends has some rights.

| Character | Creator | Species | Description |
|---|---|---|---|
| Koya | RM | Koala | He is a baby blue koala with a violet nose and removable ears that fall off when he is shocked. Described as a deep thinker, Koya lives in the Eucalyptus forest and is always asleep. |
| Van | RM | AI robot | Half of his body is gray with an "X" eye, and the other half is white with an "O" eye. He is BT21's protector and was created to represent BTS' fandom, A.R.M.Y. |
| RJ | Jin | Alpaca | He is a kind, loving, and compassionate white alpaca who always wears a red scarf. When it is cold, he sometimes puts on a light gray parka. RJ originated from Machu Picchu, hates shaving his fur, and loves cooking and eating. |
| Shooky | Suga | Cookie | His character is an extremely savage, mischievous, little cookie who is afraid of milk. He leads a cookie team called the Crunchy Squad. |
| Mang | J-Hope | Chipmunk | He is a baby purple chipmunk that keeps his face concealed in the horse-faced mask with a heart-shaped nose that he always wears. Mang loves to dance. In 2023, Mang took off his mask and revealed his face. |
| Chimmy | Jimin | Puppy | His character has been described as a "passionate" puppy whose tongue is always hanging out. Chimmy wears a yellow hoodie and loves to play the harmonica. He does not remember his past. |
| Tata | V | Prince | He is a curious crown prince from Planet BT who spreads love across the universe. He has supernatural powers; a stretchy, hyper-elastic body; a red heart-shaped head atop a blue body with yellow polka-dots. |
| Cooky | Jungkook | Bunny | His character is a cute, but tough pink bunny with one bold eyebrow and a white heart-shaped tail who wants to be strong and loves his body "like a temple". He loves boxing. |

=== ROY6 ===
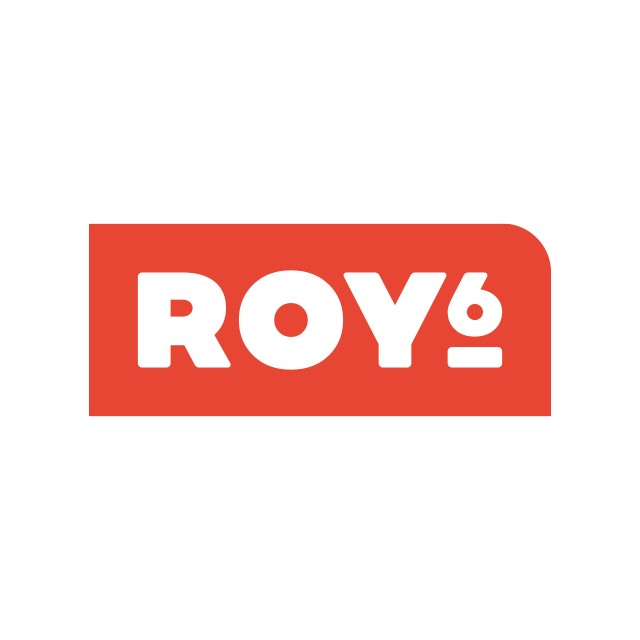
Logo of the ROY6 series

ROY6 is a character brand created by Chinese Millennial idol Roy Wang, in collaboration with the global character brand, Line Friends.

China's first and world's second FRIENDS CREATORS project, Roy Wang participated in every step, starting from initial sketches and storytelling to product planning. Videos of Roy Wang designing ROY6 are uploaded on the ROY6 YouTube Channel.

ROY6 was officially released by Line Friends in November 2018.

| Character | Species | Description |
|---|---|---|
| Royan | Sun | A lion-looking sun that descended upon the earth from the sky, and gives splendid sunlight to the people with his shiny mane. |
| Eddy | Samoyed dog | A cheerful Samoyed dog who simply loves being next to someone who needs courage and gives them a surprise hug. |
| Long Long | Dragon | A young and small dragon with an iridescent fin, Long Long brings luck to people and summons meteor showers with his magic wand. |
| Loudy | Cloud | A chatty cloud, that admires the earth more than the sky. |
| T-2000 | Robot | A clumsy but adorable robot, T-2000 shows people the future, which they hope to see on the screen. |
| Baobao Tree | Tree | A mysterious wish-bearing tree, Baobao provides a place of rest for everyone. |

=== ChiChi ===
Blackpink member Jisoo designed the new character named ChiChi, in collaboration with Nexon's kart racing game KartRider Rush+ and Line Friends.

ChiChi is a rabbit character based on Jisoo's nickname "Tuttle Rabbit Kim," which is well known by fans.

== Anime ==
Two anime series, LINE OFFLINE and LINE TOWN, were produced in 2013, picturing the Line Friends as employees for the fictional Line Corporation.

=== LINE Offline ===
Line Offline is an animated series created by Shogakukan Productions, based on salaryman characters working at "Line Corporation". All 114 episodes last about three minutes. The series was aired from January 8, 2013, to October 1, 2013.

The episodes of Line Offline are not connected. The idea behind the series is to represent the ordinary life of company employees (in this case Line's employees, hence the name "Line Offline"), in which every small problem could lead to awkward and hilarious situations that require some effort to restore the status quo.

Most characters from Line Offline are part of Line's universe (the characters who are shown in the animated series are also Line Friends, and can be seen by users in Line Messaging App and used as emoticons).

==== Episodes ====
| Episode No. | Title |
|---|---|
| 1 | "Stare" |
| 2 | "Drowsy" |
| 3 | "Phone Calls" |
| 4 | "Complaints" |
| 5 | "Preso" |
| 6 | "Meeting" |
| 7 | "Snack" |
| 8 | "Sleepy" |
| 9 | "A Secret" |
| 10 | "Tired" |
| 11 | "Memory" |
| 12 | "Receipt" |
| 13 | "Lady Sally" |
| 14 | "Stomach Ache" |
| 15 | "Mask" |
| 16 | "Overtime" |
| 17 | "Fortunetelling" |
| 18 | "Magic" |
| 19 | "Physical Examination" |
| 20 | "Pressure" |
| 21 | "Surveillance" |
| 22 | "Diet" |
| 23 | "Security" |
| 24 | "Club" |
| 25 | "Souvenirs" |
| 26 | "Lunch" |
| 27 | "Bag" |
| 28 | "Battery" |
| 29 | "Cookies" |
| 30 | "Meeting" |
| 31 | "Dream" |
| 32 | "Cold" |
| 33 | "Stickers" |
| 34 | "Talents" |
| 35 | "Ice Cream" |
| 36 | "Office Lovers" |
| 37 | "Floating Tea Stalk" |
| 38 | "Trash Can" |
| 39 | "Garbage Can" |
| 40 | "Rice Ball" |
| 41 | "Tie" |
| 42 | "Summoned" |
| 43 | "Connie Glass" |
| 44 | "Mr. Moon Glass" |
| 45 | "The Manager Glass" |
| 46 | "Drinking Party" |
| 47 | "Mirror" |
| 48 | "Casters" |
| 49 | "Memory" |
| 50 | "Pranks" |
| 51 | "Security" |
| 52 | "Fart" |
| 53 | "Spilling Over" |
| 54 | "Original" |
| 55 | "The Ultimate Presentation Tip" |
| 56 | "I Don't Remember" |
| 57 | "Fortune" |
| 58 | "Intense! Haiku Club" |
| 59 | "The Boss Gives His All" |
| 60 | "Moon's Dirty Room" |
| 61 | "That Clinking Thing" |
| 62 | "Brown in the Restroom" |
| 63 | "Trashion Impossible" |
| 64 | "Ponnus Ponnu?" |
| 65 | "Prostration" |
| 66 | "The Cockroaches Strike Back" |
| 67 | "Loving the Centerfold" |
| 68 | "You're my Shangri-La" |
| 69 | "Love Those Masks" |
| 70 | "A Mixer with Flight Attendants" |
| 71 | "Ponnus Ponnu" |
| 72 | "Goodbye James, Part. 1" |
| 73 | "Goodbye James, Part. 2" |
| 74 | "Goodbye James, (Final Part)" |
| 75 | "Sally & the Dragon" |
| 76 | "Double Dragon" |
| 77 | "Outbreak" |
| 78 | "A Sticky Situation" |
| 79 | "Marital Fight" |
| 80 | "Welcome, Oil Baron" |
| 81 | "Sally's Psych Test" |
| 82 | "Consolation Party for Moon" |
| 83 | "Sally's Job" |
| 84 | "Curse of the Kokeshi Doll" |
| 85 | "A Saying He's Tempted to Use on Wednesday" |
| 86 | "Everyone's Wok" |
| 87 | "Umbrella of Kindness" |
| 88 | "You're not Going Home Tonight" |
| 89 | "Perfectionist" |
| 90 | "Moon's Secrets Exposed!" |
| 91 | "Just the Way Connie Is" |
| 92 | "Itching James" |
| 93 | "Boss! I Can't Hold It In!" |
| 94 | "Lovely Skin! Summer Makeup!" |
| 95 | "No Food was Wasted in the Making of This Episode" |
| 96 | "A Celebration for the Manager" |
| 97 | "Moon is Happy to Answer Any Question" |
| 98 | "Connie Does Her Best" |
| 99 | "A Trip to Hawaii for Two" |
| 100 | "Men Who Make Everyone Wet" |
| 101 | "Sally's Job 2" |
| 102 | "Who Wants to be a Zillionaire?" |
| 103 | "Oh Yeah! Let's Go to Atami!" |
| 104 | "A Heated Meeting" |
| 105 | "Intense Boss Story" |
| 106 | "The Marvelous Pudding That Always Sells Out!" |
| 107 | "The Private Life of a Capable Man" |
| 108 | "A Little-Known Horror Called Back Pain" |
| 109 | "A Little-Known Horror Called Money Issues" |
| 110 | "A Little-Known Horror Called Social Hierarchy" |
| 111 | "The Last Salaryman: Part One" |
| 112 | "The Last Salaryman: Part Two" |
| 113 | "The Last Salaryman: Part Three" |
| 114 | "The Making of The Last Salaryman" |

=== LINE Town ===
| Character | Japanese dub | English dub | Species | Personality |
|---|---|---|---|---|
| Cony | Aki Kanada | Sarah Hauser | Rabbit | With a pleasant personality. She likes to go on a diet. |
| Brown | N/A | N/A | Brown bear | He likes salmon a lot. He is silent and has a crush on Cony. He becomes scared when he gets angry, and notes appear when he feels good. |
| Moon | Toshiyuki Morikawa | Michael Pizzuto | Manjū-shaped-headed man | He loves the moon. His interest is playing video games. He sometimes tricks his friends when he is bored. His father is an adventurer. |
| Boss/Mister | Nobuo Tobita | Michael Pizzuto | Human | An almost completely bald middle-aged man with glasses. He appears as many different identities in every episode. |
| James | Yūto Kazama | Daniel Garcia | Human | A narcissist with long, blonde hair. He is obsessed with his appearance and is afraid of high places. |
| Jessica | Sachi Kokuryu | Catherine Fu | Cat | Knowledgeable about fashion and loves to cook a lot. She is Cony's best friend. |
| Sally | Atsuko Enomoto | Catherine Fu | Chick | Usually helps her friends. She often stays in the windmill tree hollow in the park. She likes karaoke. |
| Leonard | Megumi Han | Jesse McCartney | Frog | A little frog boy who looks up to Moon. He refers to Moon as an "elder brother". ("Longing For") |
| Edward | N/A | N/A | Caterpillar | A green caterpillar with a cap who often stays by Sally's side. |
| Cob Taro | Nobuo Tobita | N/A | Cobra | A cobra with a Mohawk hairstyle and an eye patch that escaped from the zoo and now has a part-time job at the burger shop. |
| Dorothy | Chie Kōjiro | N/A | Hen | Likes to take gossips. Cony fears her. |
| Mr. Kinoko | Mitsuru Ogata | N/A | Beaver | Owns a mushroom dish restaurant and can cook mushroom dishes very well. Kinoko is the Japanese word for mushrooms. |

==== Episodes ====
| Episode No. | Title |
|---|---|
| 1 | "Birthday" / "Hole" |
| 2 | "Salmon-chan" / "Party" |
| 3 | "Pinch" / "Smile" |
| 4 | "Reunion" / "Shadow" |
| 5 | "Divine" / "Art" |
| 6 | "Lottery" / "Quiz" |
| 7 | "Treasure" / "Siblings" |
| 8 | "Sleeping Habit" / "Diet" |
| 9 | "Bad Hair" / "Leader" |
| 10 | "Model" / "Hero" |
| 11 | "Mud Spheres" / "Ill-Faking" |
| 12 | "Scoop" / "Typhoon" |
| 13 | "Camp" / "Audition" |
| 14 | "Temptation" / "Babysitter" |
| 15 | "The Seventh" / "Devil Zombie" |
| 16 | "Friends" / "Salusa" |
| 17 | "Space (Part 1)" / "Space (Part 2)" |
| 18 | "Mister" / "Beach" |
| 19 | "Small" / "Big" |
| 20 | "Ice" / "Mr. Robot" |
| 21 | "Ninjas" / "Bottle Opener" |
| 22 | "Car" / "Jessica" |
| 23 | "Job" / "Insist" |
| 24 | "Where?" / "Train" |
| 25 | "Corn" / "Magic" |
| 26 | "Together" / "Playing Cards" |
| 27 | "Spies" / "Pirates" |
| 28 | "Judge" / "Broken" |
| 29 | "Once in Time" / "Happiness" |
| 30 | "Copies" / "Run Errands" |
| 31 | "Dorothy" / "Weather" |
| 32 | "Galaxy" |
| 33 | "Mr. Kinoko" / "Mountain Climbing" |
| 34 | "Musical" / "Evening" |
| 35 | "Good at Compliments" / "Apple" |
| 36 | "Cheerleaders" / "Part-Time" |
| 37 | "Stationary" / "Longing For" |
| 38 | "Can-Kicking" / "Upset" |
| 39 | "Father" (Line Town Christmas Special) |
| 40 | "Line Five" (Line Town Hero Special) |
| 41 | "Lake" / "Seed" |
| 42 | "Rickshaw" / "Dark Mr. Robot" |
| 43 | "Wild" / "Meatball" |
| 44 | "Beanstalk" / "Pie" |
| 45 | "Turnover" / "Hospitality" |
| 46 | "Line Five 2" (Line Town Hero Special 2) |
| 47 | "Secret" / "Deal With" |
| 48 | "Positive" / "Fake" |
| 49 | "Tiny" / "Son" |
| 50 | "Dice" / "Line Town" |

==== Theme songs ====
| Song | Singer | Period |
|---|---|---|
| AIUEOngaku | Greeeen | Opening |
| Millefeuille Nights | Shōko Nakagawa | Ending |
| Marshmallow | Kerakera | Ending |

=== LINE Rangers ===
Line Rangers is an animated miniseries created to tie in with the Line Rangers mobile game, which featured the Line Friends characters.

It originally premiered as shorts on the Line Global YouTube Channel in 2015. It was aired as a miniseries on Cartoon Network Korea in July 2018.

An English dubbed version went up on Amazon Prime in North America on July 20, 2018. A Japanese dub which is broadcast on TV Tokyo.

=== Brown & Friends ===
On December 12, 2019, Netflix collaborated with Line Friends to create an original animated series based on the characters from Brown & Friends.

All the episodes from the first season, including 3 special episodes based on seasonal occasions, such as Halloween and Christmas, released on December 29, 2022.

=== Unnamed anime television series ===
On May 15, 2023, it was announced that the fourth generation of the LINE Creators Support Program would inspire an anime television series adaptation that would premiere on CBC TV in 2024.

== Products ==
- Friends (smart speaker) – with Brown and Sally as the speaker's appearance
- LINE FRIENDS x Sailor (fountain pens) – Sailor Pens produces fountain pens of Brown and Sally in their Pro Gear Slim size with 14K gold nib choices of EF, F, MF, M, and B. The pens are exclusive to the North American market and were announced in July 2022.

== Physical stores ==
Apart from its online store, physical stores have been opened in:

| Country | CIty |
|---|---|
| China | Chengdu |
| China | Nanjing |
| China | Hong Kong |
| Indonesia | Jakarta |
| South Korea | Seoul |
| Taiwan | Taipei |
| Thailand | Bangkok |
| United States | Los Angeles |
| United States | New York City |

The popularity of Line Friends in China surged in 2016. During that one year, six physical storefronts were opened. At one time, there were as many as twelve of them in different cities in China. As their segment of the market became increasingly crowded, however, Line Friends began to phase out its physical presence in China by closing down shops. As of May 2021, only the Chengdu and Nanjing stores remained open.

== Collaborations ==
On November 21, 2019, it was announced on the official Brawl Stars YouTube channel that Brawl Stars would collaborate with Line Friends, adding new skins based on Line Friends characters.

== See also ==
- Naver Corporation
- Line
- KakaoTalk
- Kakao Friends
