= Ungoogled Chromium =

Chromium-based free web browser

ungoogled-chromium
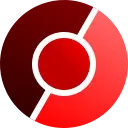

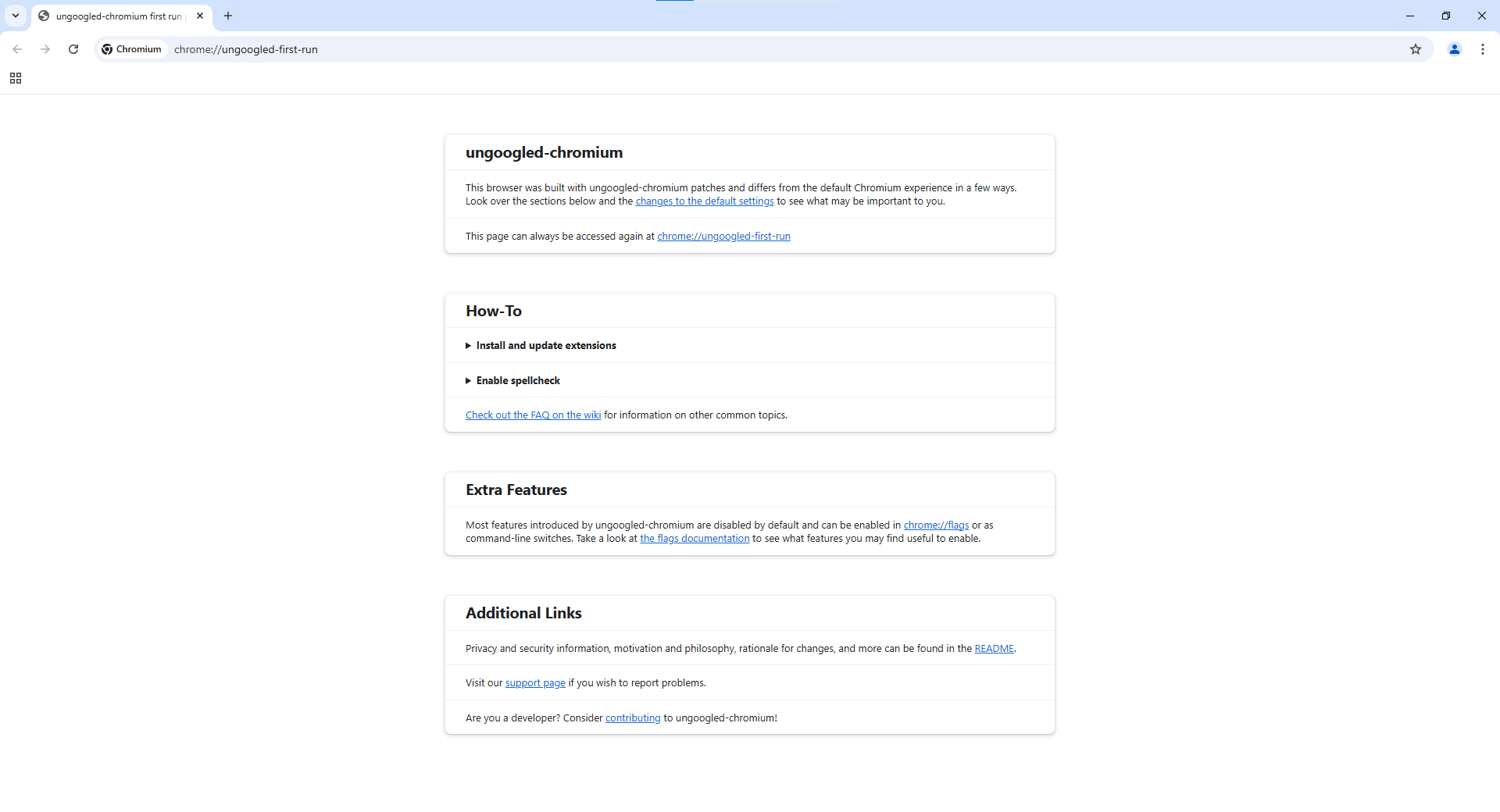
- ungoogled-chromium 134 on Windows 10
- Developers: Eloston and other hobbyists, collectively called "Ungoogled Software"
- Initial release: 14 December 2015; 10 years ago
- Stable release: 148.0.7778.178-1 (20 May 2026; 6 days ago)
- Engine: V8, Blink
- Operating system: Linux, macOS, Microsoft Windows, Android, BSD
- Platform: x86-64, AArch64, ARMv7, IA-32
- License: 3-clause BSD License
- Website: ungoogled-software.github.io
- Repository: https://github.com/ungoogled-software/ungoogled-chromium

Ungoogled Chromium (stylized as ungoogled-chromium) is a free and open-source fork of the Chromium web browser that removes all Google-specific web services. It achieves this with a series of patches applied to the Chromium codebase during the compilation process. The result is functionally similar to regular Chromium.

== Features ==
- Disabling functionality that requires connection to Google, including Google Safe Browsing.
- Replacing Google web domains with non-existent domains, and blocking internal requests to those domains.
- Removing binary blobs from the Chromium source code and replacing them with custom alternatives.
- Adding dozens of flags to change browser behavior that is otherwise unconfigurable.

Some features of regular Chromium do not work the same on ungoogled-chromium. For example, a special browser extension, called chromium-web-store, is required to install other extensions from the Chrome Web Store.

== History ==
The ungoogled-chromium project was founded by a hobbyist with the username Eloston in 2015. It was first developed for Linux, then for other operating systems. Eloston used to release builds, but eventually he stopped doing so and allowed others to provide builds with his patches.

Starting in 2019, Eloston greatly reduced his involvement in the project, and other developers have continued to maintain the patches. In 2022, the GitHub repository was transferred from Eloston's personal account to a new "ungoogled-software" account.
