= Naver Dictionary =

South Korean online dictionary

- Native name: 네이버 사전
- Website type: Online dictionary
- Available in: 67 languages
- Owner: Naver
- Website: dict.naver.com

Naver Dictionary (Korean: 네이버 사전) is an online dictionary operated by the South Korean software company Naver. It was first launched in 1999, alongside the Naver web portal.

== Background ==
Naver Dictionary was launched in 1999, supporting the English language. It began launching mobile applications in 2010. The product Line Dictionary, launched in 2014, was part of the platform. By 2022, the platform reportedly had 60 different sub services, and was the most popular online dictionary service in South Korea by 2021.

Naver Dictionary contains many definitions of words, a Korean audio pronunciation service, and easy searching and accessibility of words. It partners with and shows results from other dictionaries, including the Oxford Dictionary of English, Collins English Dictionary, Wiktionary, and Urban Dictionary. In 2014, Naver reportedly spent ₩100 billion per year to access databases and reference materials. It also show results from the Dictionary of Tourism Terms (관광용어 용례사전) by the Korea Tourism Organization, Jeolla dialect dictionary in 2022, Multilingual Dictionary of Korean Art Terminology (한국미술 다국어 용어사전) in 2023, and Urimalsaem, which is operated by the National Institute of Korean Language.

The dictionary supported 19 languages in 2019, 37 by 2016. During that time, Naver Dictionary began operating a Vietnamese-Korean dictionary; the dictionary reportedly was used by 32.6% of mobile users in Vietnam. It supported 41 languages by 2018, and 55 languages by 2021, including Greek, Burmese, Tetum, and Hebrew.

In 2018, it launched an open-source dictionary called Open Dictionary PRO (ODP). The service aggregates various dictionaries, glossaries, encyclopedias, images, video, and audio related to definitions. Users are able to create their own dictionaries on the platform. In June 2023, the South Korean Ministry of the Interior and Safety began offering standardized translations for public signs in eight languages on the platform.

== Supported languages ==
- English (Korean-English, English-English)
- Korean
- Hanja
- Japanese
- Chinese
- French
- Spanish
- German
- Vietnamese
- Nepali
- Lao
- Mongolian
- Burmese
- Swahili
- Arabic
- Urdu
- Uzbek
- Indonesian
- Cambodian
- Tagalog
- Thai
- Tetum
- Persian
- Hausa
- Hebrew (Ancient, Modern)
- Hindi
- Greek (Ancient, Modern)
- Dutch
- Norwegian
- Danish
- Latin
- Russian
- Romanian
- Swedish
- Albanian
- Ukrainian
- Italian
- Georgian
- Czech
- Croatian
- Turkish
- Portuguese
- Polish
- Finnish
- Hungarian

== See also ==
- Naver Papago – machine translation service also by Naver
