= Wave (smart speaker) =

- Logo used in Korean markets
- Developer: Naver Corporation; Line Corporation
- Type: Smart speaker
- Released: July 2017 (Japan); August 2017 (Korea)
- CPU: Qualcomm APQ8009
- Input: Voice commands
- Connectivity: Wi-Fi 2.4 GHz, Bluetooth 4.1
- Weight: 998 g (2.20 lb)
- Successor: Friends
- Website: clova.ai/ko/ (Korea) clova.line.me/wave/ (Japan)

Wave (stylized as Clova WAVE in Japan or WAVE in Korea) is a smart speaker developed by Naver Corporation and Line Corporation (a subsidiary of Naver). Wave was the first speaker to be powered by intelligent personal assistant Clova. The product has a cylindrical shape with colored status LEDs on the top and bottom of the device and touch buttons on the top. Voice commands is currently only available in Japanese and Korean.

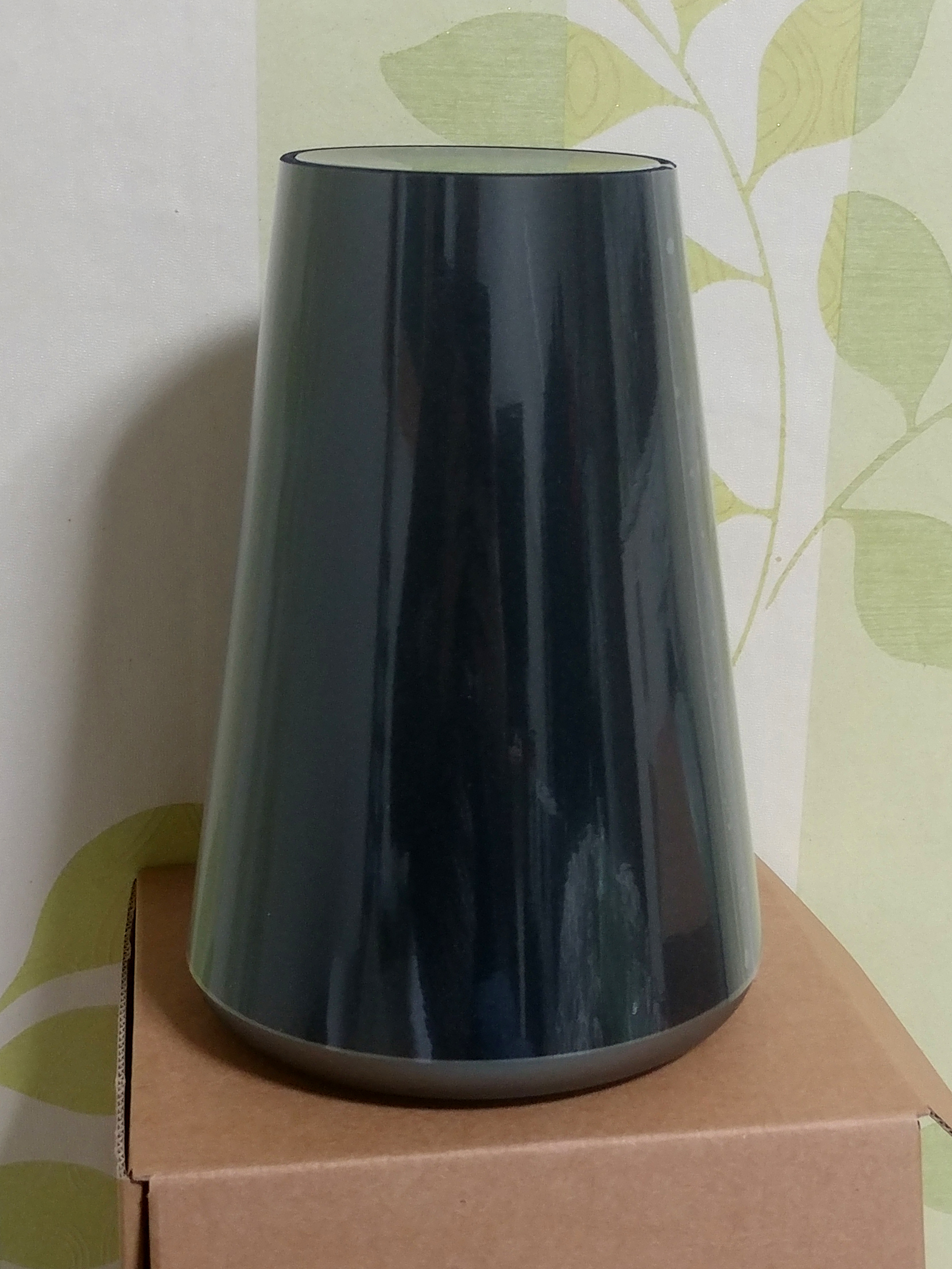
Wave speaker

Launched in July 2017, Wave was promoted with Line Music as a bundle package in Japan. In August 2017, Wave was launched in Korea. Just like other similar smart speakers, Wave are capable of doing tasks such as reading text messages, creating memos, online shopping, calling taxis and controlling home appliances. The speaker is currently available in Japan and Korea.

In December 2017, Naver Corporation released their second smart speaker that is also powered by Clova – Friends.
