= Friends (smart speaker) =

LINE character-themed smart speaker

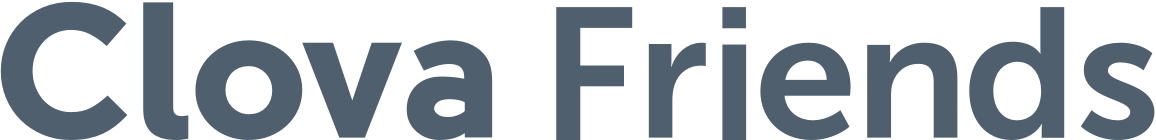
- Logo used in Japanese markets
- Developer: Naver Corporation; Line Corporation
- Type: Smart speaker
- Released: December 2017
- Input: Voice commands
- Connectivity: Wi-Fi 2.4 GHz + 5 GHz; Bluetooth 4.2
- Weight: 378 g (0.83 lb)
- Predecessor: Wave
- Website: clova.ai/ko/ (Korea) clova.line.me/clova-friends/ (Japan)

Clova Friends Brown

Friends (stylized as Clova Friends in Japan) is a LINE character-themed smart speaker developed by Naver Corporation and Line Corporation (a subsidiary of Naver). The device is the second smart speaker that is powered by intelligent personal assistant Clova. Introduced in December 2017, Friends has a cylindrical shape and has the appearance of the characters in LINE Friends – Brown the bear and Sally the chick, providing two versions – Friends BROWN and Friends SALLY. The "Action" button, which activates the device, is placed on the nose of the character, while a LED indicator and other buttons such as volume and bluetooth settings are placed on the back. The LED ring are placed at the bottom of Friends.

Same as the Wave smart speaker, it was first introduced as a bundle package included with Line Music. The developer, Naver and Line, claims that this kind of character design gives "a sense of character, and [...] a same sense of familiarity". Same as the Wave, the device is able to do tasks such as reading text messages, creating memos, online shopping, calling taxis and controlling home appliances. Voice commands is currently only available in Japanese and Korean and the device is currently available in Japan and Korea.

Other than Friends, Naver partnered with South Korean cellular carrier LG U^{+} to release Friends+, a speaker that will run the U+ Home AI rather than Clova.
