= Denis Yarats =

Computer scientist

- Born: 1987 (age 38–39); Gomel, Belarusian SSR, USSR
- Education: Belarusian State University (BA); New York University (PhD)
- Occupations: Software engineer, tech entrepreneur
- Known for: Co-founder and CTO of Perplexity AI

Denis Yarats (born 1987) is a computer scientist and entrepreneur, best known as the co-founder and Chief Technology Officer (CTO) of Perplexity AI, an AI-powered search engine launched in 2022.

== Early life and education ==
Yarats was born in Gomel, USSR, located in modern Belarus. His father worked at a tractor factory and his mother was a housewife. He spent his early life there and in Minsk where he obtained a bachelor's degree in applied mathematics and IT from Belarusian State University. In 2008 he became a finalist in Google Code Jam, but failed to get employed due to poor English skills and preparation. He received his Ph.D. in computer science from New York University, where his research focused on reinforcement learning and natural language.

== Career ==
After his graduation in Belarus, Yarats moved to Moscow where he worked in Yandex maps as a Software Engineer. In his early career, Yarats held research positions at several institutions, including Facebook AI Research (FAIR). His work during this time focused on developing scalable algorithms for learning and decision-making in complex environments.

Yarats worked in Seattle as a Software Development Engineer at Microsoft from 2011 to 2013, where he worked on the Bing search engine. From 2013 to 2016, he worked at Quora as a Staff Machine Learning Engineer in charge of technical projects, and from 2016 to 2022 he worked as an AI Research Scientist at Facebook AI Research (FAIR, now Meta AI).

Yarats co‑authored Image Augmentation Is All You Need: Regularizing Deep Reinforcement Learning from Pixels (Yarats, Kostrikov & Fergus, ICLR 2021), which introduced the DrQ method using simple image-based data augmentations to enable model-free RL algorithms like SAC and DQN to learn directly from pixels and achieve state-of-the-art results on both DeepMind Control Suite and Atari 100k benchmarks.

=== Perplexity AI ===
In 2022, Yarats co-founded Perplexity AI alongside Aravind Srinivas, Johnny Ho and Andy Konwinski. He met Srinivas during student exchange program in Berkeley. As CTO, he led the development of the company's flagship product, an AI powered search engine designed to deliver concise, source-backed answers to user queries. The platform gained significant user traction and investment, with the company securing over $70 million in Series B funding and reaching millions of active users within two years of its launch. As of 2025, the company had raised $200 million at a $20 billion valuation.
