= Naver Whale =

South Korean web browser

Naver Whale; 네이버 웨일

- Whale browser on Windows 11, Wikipedia
- Developer: Naver Corporation
- Initial release: October 16, 2017; 8 years ago

Stable release(s)
- macOS, Windows: 4.35.351.16 / 12 January 2026
- Android: 3.5.3.2 / 20 August 2024
- iOS, iPadOS: 3.7.0 / 12 December 2024
- Engines: Blink (WebKit on iOS/iPadOS), V8
- Operating system: Android 8.0 and later; iOS 15 and later; iPadOS 15 and later; macOS 10.15 and later; Linux; Windows 7 and later
- Platform: IA-32, x86-64
- Type: Web browser, mobile browser
- License: Freeware
- Website: whale.naver.com/en

Naver Whale (Korean: 네이버 웨일) is a freeware web browser developed by South Korean technology company Naver Corporation, which is available in English and Korean. It became available on Android on April 13, 2018.

== Features ==
Naver Whale became available on Android on April 13, 2018. Pages can be translated through its Naver Papago service and can translate from many other languages. The Naver Whale browser has its own extensions that can be accessed through the Whale Store.

== Service ==
Naver Whale Browser offers the ability called Whale On to conduct video conferencing without worrying about time limits. Up to 500 people can access at the same time, and various functions such as screen sharing and microphone/camera control are available.

== See also ==
- Naver Papago
- Clova (virtual assistant)
