= AI browser =

Web browser with integrated AI capabilities

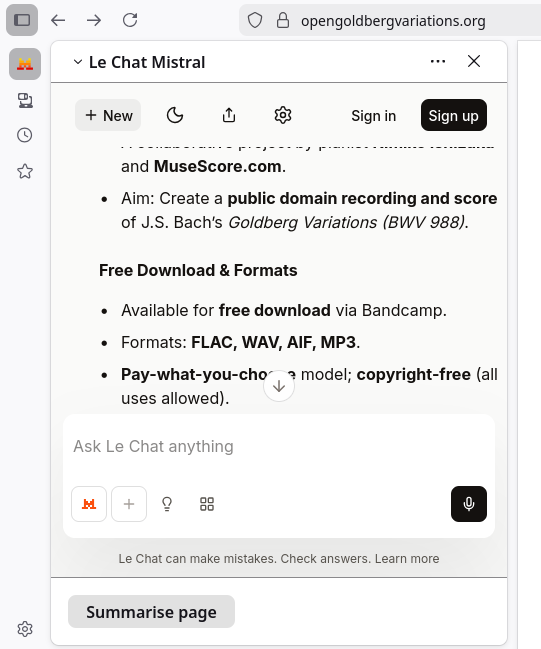
Example of a web browser with AI capabilities: Mistral AI Le Chat on Firefox summarizing the webpage of Open Goldberg Variations within a chatbot window

An AI browser is a web browser with integrated artificial intelligence capabilities, such as automatically summarizing web page content or answering questions about it. A more specialized type is an agentic browser, based on the concept of agentic AI, which can take actions – such as navigating webpages or filling out forms – on behalf of the user.

Several agentic browsers emerged in 2025, including ChatGPT Atlas (macOS only), Comet, and Dia.

As of 2025, this is a recent development in the browser market, including new entrants from OpenAI, Opera and Perplexity. The designation of 'AI browser' also includes established browsers that later added non-agentic AI features, such as Microsoft Edge with the Copilot chatbot, Google Chrome with the Gemini chatbot (for Windows desktop users in the US with their language set to English), and Firefox with multiple chatbot providers (such as ChatGPT, Claude, Copilot, Gemini, and Le Chat).

AI browsers have been noted to be susceptible to prompt injection attacks.

== Browser extensions and integrations ==
Rather than creating entirely new browsers, some AI browsing solutions integrate with existing browsers through extensions or companion applications. These tools add agentic capabilities to established browsers without requiring users to switch platforms. Examples include Composite, which functions as a cross-browser agent that works with Chrome, Edge, and other browsers to automate web-based tasks for workers.

== Cloud-based implementations ==
Cloud-based implementations of AI browsers allow users to run automated browsing agents without local installation. These systems operate on remote servers using frameworks such as Puppeteer or Playwright. Examples include Browserbase, Browser-use and AI Browser. The AI typically parses the Document Object Model (DOM) to locate and interact with page elements, and may also analyze browser screenshots to interpret layout and structure.

== Criticisms and dangers ==
AI browsers have been noted to be susceptible to being vulnerable to prompt injection attacks, in which the content of websites can be used to hijack the control of the browser. Multiple organisations have argued against using AI browsers due to this vulnerability. The United Kingdom national cyber security centre and Gartner consider them to be too risky for adoption by most organisations.

A study by the CISPA Helmholtz Center and Saarland University concluded that this vulnerability makes them easy targets for malware, fraud, automated defamation, disinformation and biased outputs.
