= Comet (browser) =

Web browser developed by Perplexity AI

- Screenshot of Comet showing the onboarding page with the Comet Assistant on the right side. The Comet Assistant answered to a prompt "Can you explain the upcoming Glam update for Final Fantasy XIV Online?"
- Developer: Perplexity AI
- Release: Microsoft Windows and macOS: July 9, 2025; 12 months ago Android: November 20, 2025; 8 months ago iOS: March 18, 2026; 4 months ago
- Engine: Blink
- Operating system: Windows 10 or later, macOS Big Sur or later, Android 12 or later, iOS 18 or later, visionOS 2.0 or later
- License: Proprietary, based on an open-source software project
- Website: perplexity.ai/comet

Comet is an AI browser based on Chromium. It was released by Perplexity AI for Microsoft Windows and macOS on July 9, 2025, for Android on November 20, 2025, and for iOS on March 18, 2026.

Initial access to the browser was limited to users subscribed to Perplexity's most expensive tier, with broader availability expected over time. The browser was released for free download in October 2025.

== Features ==
Comet is integrated with Perplexity's AI-assisted search engine. The browser features an assistant which enables users to perform a variety of tasks such as generating article summaries, sending emails, or buying products.

== Security concerns ==
Researchers at LayerX Security identified a malicious attack vector which they call CometJacking. The exploit could exfiltrate a user's sensitive personal data to a remote server controlled by the attacker. LayerX attempted to responsibly disclose their findings to Comet's developer Perplexity AI in August 2025. According to LayerX's blog post Perplexity responded that they saw no security impact and marked the disclosure as not applicable. Later Perplexity told Time they independently identified the issue and patched the vulnerability.
