= Clova (virtual assistant) =

AI platform by Naver

- Icon of Clova in Android

- Screenshot
- Developer: Naver Corporation
- Release: March 2017; 9 years ago
- Operating system: Android, iOS
- Available in: Korean, Japanese
- Type: Intelligent personal assistant
- Website: clova.ai

Clova is an intelligent personal assistant for Android and iOS operating systems developed by Naver Corporation. NAVER introduced its artificial intelligence platform Clova (styled as CLOVA, short for "cloud virtual assistant") in March 2017.

== History ==
Clova was introduced in March 2017. The Clova platform first powered Wave, a smart speaker with voice recognition capabilities. Over time, it was expanded to include other features such as image classification, optical character recognition (OCR), dubbing, and smart home applications.

In May 2017, Clova was released on iOS and Android.

In October 2020, Naver released Clova Lamp, an AI light that reads books, which works when user opens a book under the camera on the lamp and press the book reading button or use a voice command. It supports books in English as well as Korean.

== Functionality ==
=== Papago Translation ===
Papago is an AI Naver product that has been integrated into the Clova app. It is a neural machine translation service that delivers quality translation of texts into various languages.

=== Clova Voice ===
Clova Voice can create voice synthesizers with new speakers and styles from a minimum of a 40-minute long audio and text.

== Interface ==
Clova Interface Connect is a platform service for hardware manufacturers and IOT companies. It allows them to connect Clova to speakers, microphones, and any other internet-connected device. The app also features a holographic home assistant from Gatebox.

== See also ==
- Naver Whale
- Naver Papago
