= XPInstall =

File format standing for Cross-Platform Install

XPInstall (XPI)
- Filename extension: .xpi
- Internet media type: application/x-xpinstall
- Developed by: Mozilla Foundation

XPInstall (Cross-Platform Install) was a technology used by the Mozilla Application Suite, SeaMonkey, Mozilla Firefox, Mozilla Thunderbird and other XUL-based applications for installing Mozilla extensions that add functionality to the main application. Support for XPInstall was removed from Firefox in November 2017 with the release of Firefox 57.

== Overview ==
A XPI (pronounced "zippy" and derived from XPInstall) installer module is a ZIP file that contains an install script or a manifest at the root of the file, and a number of data files. XPI files allowed users to install add-ons, themes, and other extensions to customize their Mozilla applications.

In early versions of Mozilla (Firefox before 0.7 and Thunderbird before 0.5), the package contained a JavaScript install script (install.js) with some directives for actions to take during an install, including adding files and directories, removing old or obsolete files and directories, executing command line tools, etc. In later versions of Firefox and Thunderbird, the install script was replaced by a chrome manifest and a resource description framework file (install.rdf).

== Deprecation ==
In August 2015, Mozilla announced plans to deprecate add-ons based on XUL, XPCOM, and the Add-on SDK in favor of a new WebExtensions API. Mozilla cited several reasons for the transition:

- Security concerns: Legacy extensions had unrestricted access to Firefox internals, creating security vulnerabilities
- Performance issues: XUL/XPCOM extensions interfered with Firefox's transition to a multiprocess architecture (Electrolysis/e10s)
- Development complexity: The tight coupling between Firefox and its add-ons caused development delays and crashes
- Cross-browser compatibility: WebExtensions, based on Chrome's extension model, enabled developers to create extensions that worked across multiple browsers

=== Impact ===
The transition to Firefox 57 affected thousands of extensions. Many popular add-ons were rewritten using the WebExtensions API, while others were discontinued because their functionality could not be replicated within the more restrictive WebExtensions framework. The change was controversial within the Firefox community, with some users and developers praising improved cross-browser compatibility while others criticized the loss of customization capabilities. Some users migrated to Firefox forks such as Pale Moon and Waterfox, which continued to support legacy extensions.

== Legacy ==
The .xpi file extension continues to be used for WebExtensions in Firefox. Modern XPI files contain a manifest.json file instead of install.rdf and use the WebExtensions API rather than XUL/XPCOM. Several applications maintained XPInstall support after Firefox discontinued it:

- Pale Moon: Forked Firefox's codebase to create the Unified XUL Platform (UXP), which continues to support traditional XUL extensions
- SeaMonkey: Re-implemented XUL support for newer codebases, though development has slowed
- Thunderbird: Gradually transitioned away from XUL-based extensions, removing support in version 78 (2020)

== See also ==
- Add-on (Mozilla)
- XUL
- XPCOM
- Browser extension
- Mozilla Archive Format
