= Waterfox =

Free and open-source web browser based on Firefox

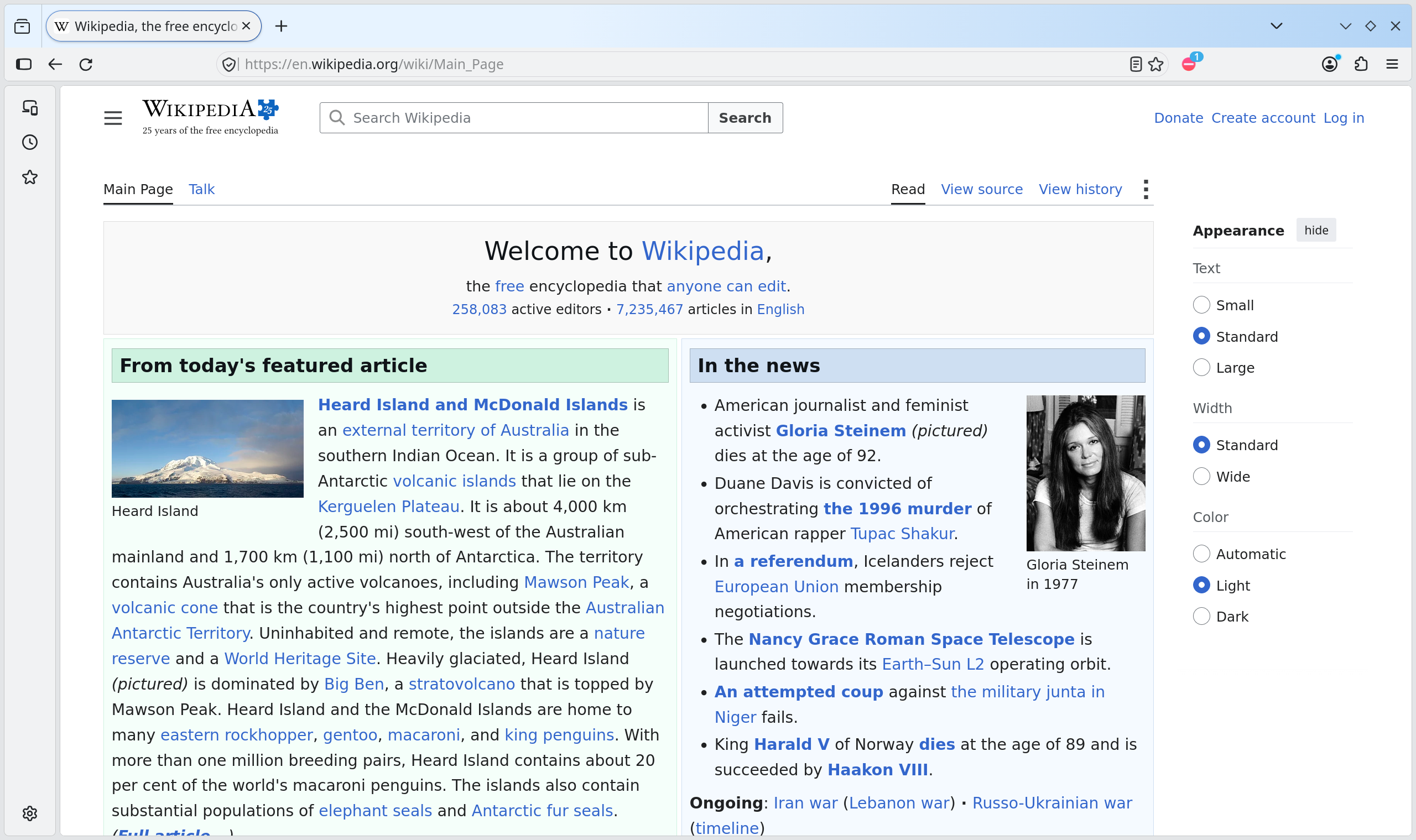
- Screenshot of Waterfox 6.7.1.1 running on KDE Plasma, showing the Main Page of the English Wikipedia
- Original author: Alexandros Kontos
- Developers: Alexandros Kontos, BrowserWorks Ltd.
- Release: 27 March 2011; 15 years ago
- Stable release: 6.7.8 / 7 November 2026; 12 days ago
- Preview release: G6.7.0 Beta 3 / July 30, 2026; 3 months ago
- Written in: C, C++, CSS, JavaScript, XUL
- Engine: Gecko, SpiderMonkey
- Operating system: Android 8 and later; Linux; macOS 10.15 and later; Windows 10 and later
- Platform: x64, ARM64, PPC64LE
- Type: Web browser, mobile web browser, feed reader
- License: MPL-2.0
- Website: www.waterfox.com
- Repository: github.com/BrowserWorks/Waterfox

Waterfox is a free and open-source web browser and fork of Firefox. It claims to be ethical and user-centric, emphasizing performance and privacy. There are official Waterfox releases for Windows, macOS, Linux and Android. It was created in 2012 to provide official 64-bit support when Firefox was only available for 32-bit systems.

== Divisions ==
=== Waterfox ===
Waterfox shares core features and technologies like the Gecko browser engine and support for Firefox Add-ons with Firefox. It is also compatible with Google Chrome and Opera extensions. It disables telemetry by default, which is present in Firefox builds. However, it collects technical information about the user's device to update properly.

=== Waterfox Classic ===
Waterfox Classic was a version of the browser based on an older version of the Gecko engine that supported legacy XUL and XPCOM add-on capabilities that Firefox removed in version 57. It was partially maintained with fixes and patches from Waterfox and Firefox ESR releases. However, its development had been separated due to several changes from Waterfox that were otherwise inapplicable, and with its final published release in November 2022 it is effectively discontinued as of 2026.

Waterfox Classic has multiple unpatched security advisories. The developer states that "changes between versions [are] so numerous between ESRs making merging difficult if not impossible".

== History ==
Waterfox was first released by Alex Kontos on 27 March 2011 for 64-bit Windows. The macOS build was introduced on 14 May 2015 with the release of version 38.0, the Linux build was introduced on 20 December 2016 with the release of version 50.0, and an Android build was first introduced on 10 October 2017 in version 55.2.2.

From 22 July 2015 to 12 November 2015, Waterfox had its own search-engine called "Storm" that would raise funds for charity and Waterfox. Storm was developed with over £2 million of investor funding and powered by Yahoo! Search.

In December 2019, System1, an advertising company which portrays itself as privacy-focused, acquired Waterfox. In July 2023, Alex Kontos announced that Waterfox had been turned into an independent project again.

An Android release of the browser was made available via the Google Play Store in November 2023.

In April 2025, Waterfox launched a privacy-friendly metasearch engine, using Google's search results. It is currently available as a single tier costing $5 a month, offering unlimited private searches, including web, image, video, and news searches, with no ads, trackers, or search history.

=== Logos ===
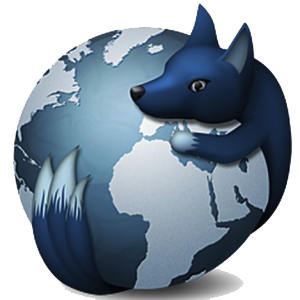
Waterfox logo used until 2015

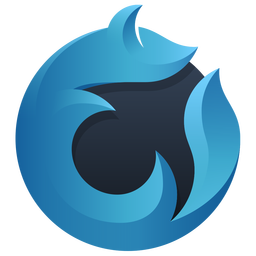
Waterfox logo used from 2015 to March 2019

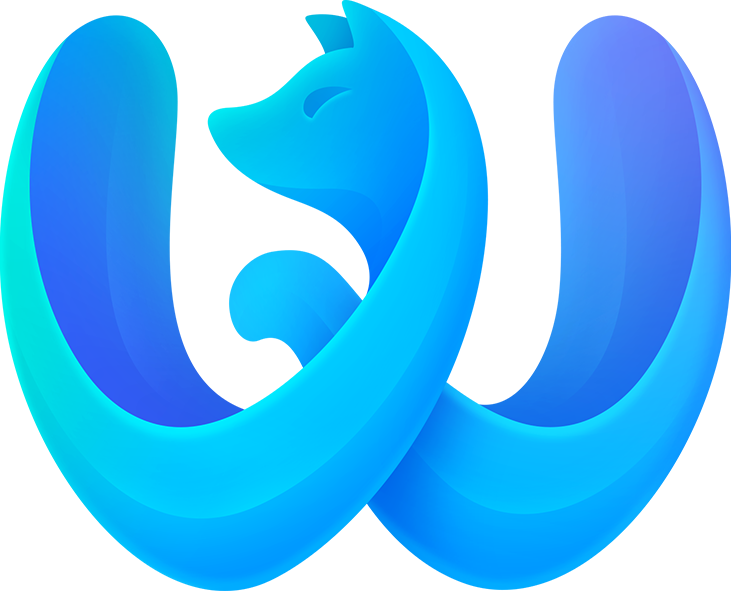
Waterfox logo used from March to June 2019

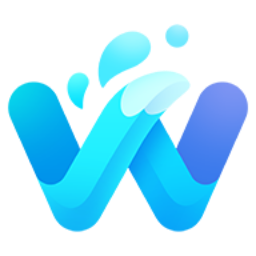
Waterfox logo used from May 2019 to August 2023

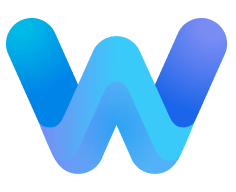
Waterfox logo used from August to September 2023

Waterfox logo used from September 2023 to present

== See also ==
- LibreWolf
- GNU IceCat
- Pale Moon
- Basilisk
- K-Meleon
