= Komodo Edit =

Text editor for dynamic programming languages

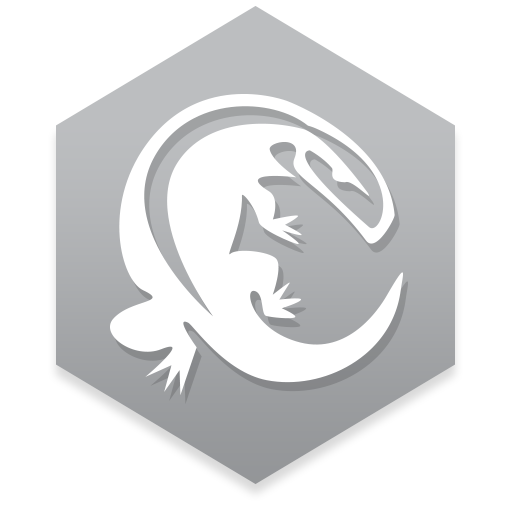

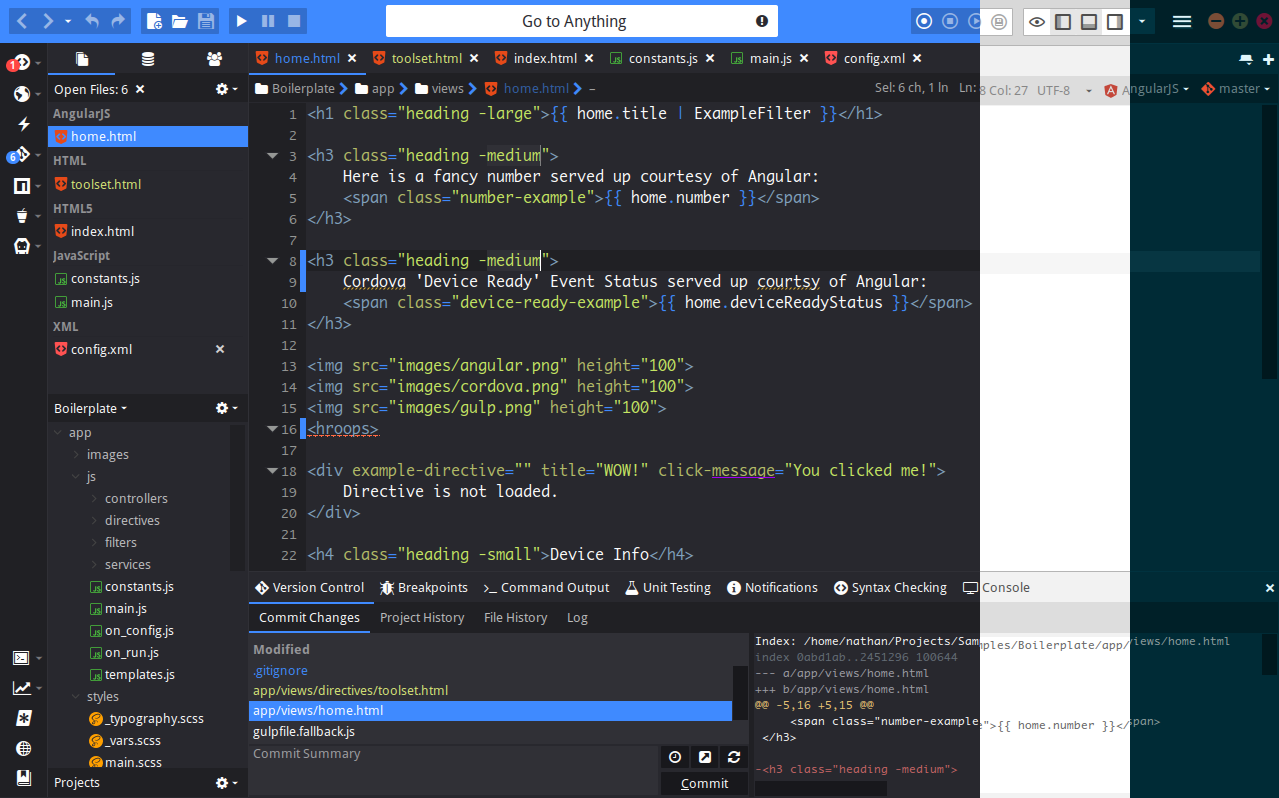
- Screenshot of Komodo Edit
- Developer: ActiveState
- Initial release: November 2007; 18 years ago
- Stable release: 12.0.1 / 10 February 2020
- Repository: github.com/Komodo/KomodoEdit
- Written in: C++, C, XUL, Perl, Python, JavaScript, Tcl
- Operating system: Windows XP and later; OS X 10.9 and later; Red Hat Enterprise Linux 5 or later; CentOS 6.0 or later; Fedora 18 or later; OpenSUSE 13.1 or later; SUSE Linux Enterprise 11.2 or later; Ubuntu 12.04 or later
- Size: ~74.6 MB
- Type: Text editor, IDE
- License: MPL-1.1
- Website: www.activestate.com/products/komodo-edit/

Komodo Edit is a free and open source text editor for dynamic programming languages. It was introduced in January 2007 to complement ActiveState's commercial Komodo IDE. As of version 4.3, Komodo Edit is built atop the Open Komodo project. Komodo IDE is no longer supported and maintained by developers for Python.

== History ==
Komodo Edit 4.0 was originally a freeware version of Komodo IDE 4.0, released in 2007-02-14.

On 2008-03-05, ActiveState Software Inc. announced Komodo Edit 4.3 to be open-sourced software, licensed under Mozilla Public License (MPL), GNU General Public License (GPL), and GNU Lesser Public License (LGPL). The last version is 12.0.1.

=== Open Komodo ===
It is a subset version of Komodo Edit, with initial goal of Web development. The code was to be available between late October or early November 2007, with Open Komodo code repository created by ActiveState in August 2007.

On 2007-10-30, ActiveState Software Inc. announced the release of Open Komodo. The initial release was 1.0.0 Alpha 1.

=== Komodo Snapdragon ===
It is an announced initiative from ActiveState to create an open source development environment that promotes open standards on the web. It was to be based on Open Komodo.

== Features ==
Many of Komodo's features are derived from an embedded Python interpreter.

Open Komodo uses Mozilla and Scintilla code base to provide its features, including support for many popular languages (including Python, Perl, PHP, Ruby, Tcl, SQL, Smarty, CSS, HTML, and XML), across all common operating systems (Linux, OS X, and Windows). The editor component is implemented using the Netscape Plugin Application Programming Interface (NPAPI), with the Scintilla view embedded in the XML User Interface Language (XUL) interface in the same manner as a web browser plugin.

Both Komodo Edit and IDE support user customizing via plug-ins and macros. Komodo plug-ins are based on Mozilla Add-ons and extensions can be searched for, downloaded, configured, installed and updated from within the application. Available extensions include a functions list, pipe features, additional language support and user interface enhancements.

Komodo IDE has features found in an integrated development environment (IDE), such as integrated debugger support, Document Object Model (DOM) viewer, interactive shells, source code control integration, and the ability to select the engine used to run regular expressions, to ensure compatibility with the final deployment target.

The commercial version also adds code browsing, a database explorer, collaboration, support for many popular source code control systems, and more. Independent implementations of some of these features, such as the database editor, Git support, and remote FTP file access, are available in the free version via Komodo Edit's plugin system.
