= Nightingale (software) =

Open source audio player

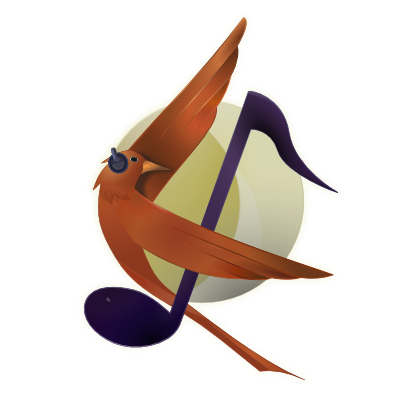

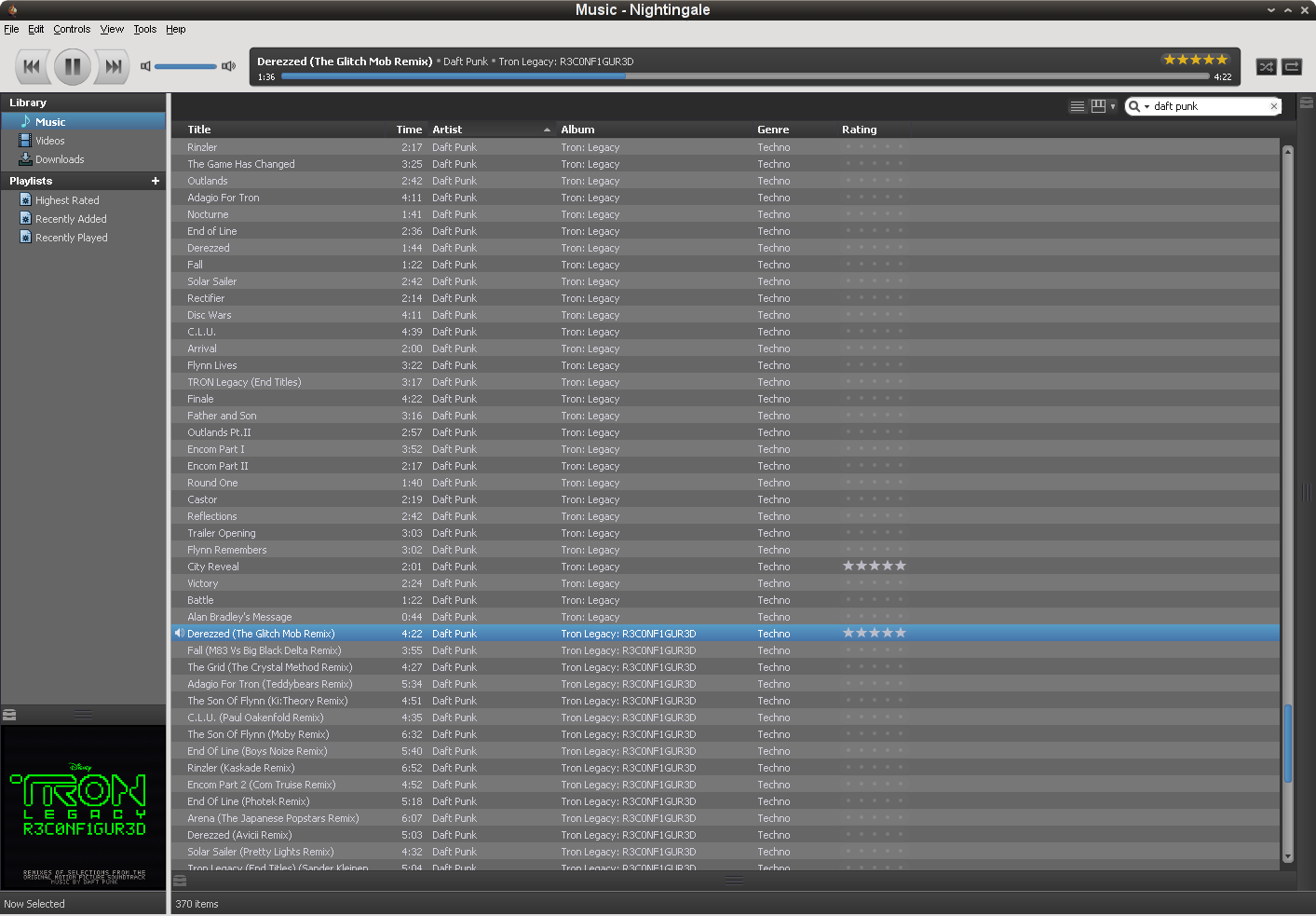
- Nightingale 1.8.1 on Linux
- Developer: Nightingale Community
- Initial release: December 15, 2011; 13 years ago
- Final release: 1.12.1 (January 12, 2014; 11 years ago) [±]
- Written in: C++
- Operating system: Linux, macOS, Windows
- Platform: IA-32, x86-64
- Type: Media player
- License: GPLv2, MPL, BSD
- Website: getnightingale.com

Nightingale is a discontinued free, open source audio player based on the Songbird media player source code. As such, Nightingale's engine is based on the Mozilla XULRunner with libraries such as the GStreamer media framework and libtag providing media tagging and playback support, amongst others.

Since official support for Linux was dropped by Songbird in April 2010, Linux-using members of the Songbird community diverged and created the project. By contrast to Songbird, which is primarily licensed under the GPLv2 but includes artwork that is not freely distributable, Nightingale is free software, licensed under the GPLv2, with portions under the MPL and BSD licenses.

Nightingale has not seen a new release since 2014 and most, if not all, Nightingale developers are no longer actively contributing to its development.

== Notable features ==
- Plugins compatible with Songbird (with one modification to the addon)
- Multi-platform compatibility with Windows XP, Vista, 7, 10, Linux and Mac OS X v10.5 (x86, x86-64).
- Ability to play multiple audio formats, such as MP3, AAC, Ogg Vorbis, FLAC, Apple Lossless and WMA
- Ability to play Apple FairPlay-encoded audio on Windows and Mac platforms via hooks into QuickTime (authorization takes place in iTunes)
- Ability to play Windows Media DRM audio on Windows platforms
- A skinnable interface, with skins called "feathers"
- Media files stored on pages viewed in the browser show up as playable files in Nightingale
- MP3 file download
- Ability to subscribe to MP3 blogs as playlists
- Ability to build custom mixes
- Ability to scan the user's computer for all audio files and add them to a local library
- A configurable and collapsible graphical user interface similar to iTunes, and mini-player mode
- Keyboard shortcuts and media keyboard support
- Last.fm integration via a plugin, complete with love/hate buttons
- Microsoft MTP compatible device support
- Ability to edit and save metadata tags
- Gapless playback and ReplayGain
- Watch folders
- Media import and export (from and to iTunes)
- Automatic Library Files Organization

== Add-ons ==
=== Extensions ===
Users can add features and change functionality in Nightingale by installing extensions. Extensions are similar to the Extensions for the Firefox browser and can be easily ported. Community coded extensions are available on The Nightingale Addons Page.

=== Skins ===
Skins are referred to as "feathers" in Nightingale, and give users and artists the ability to change the look of Nightingale via an extension which generates a default skin. Using CSS (and optionally XUL), and an image manipulation program such as Photoshop or GIMP, users are then able to make Nightingale look however they want.
