= Web archive (disambiguation) =

Web archiving is the process of collecting portions of the World Wide Web to ensure the information is preserved in an archive for future researchers, historians, and the public.

Web archive may also refer to:

- Web Archive (format), or .webarchive, file format for saving and reviewing complete web pages using the Safari web browser
- Web ARChive, or WARC, archive format
- Wayback Machine, digital archive of the World Wide Web and other information on the Internet
- Web application archive, or WAR, file format

== See also ==
- List of web archiving file formats
- Internet archive (disambiguation)
