= Komodo IDE =

Integrated development environment

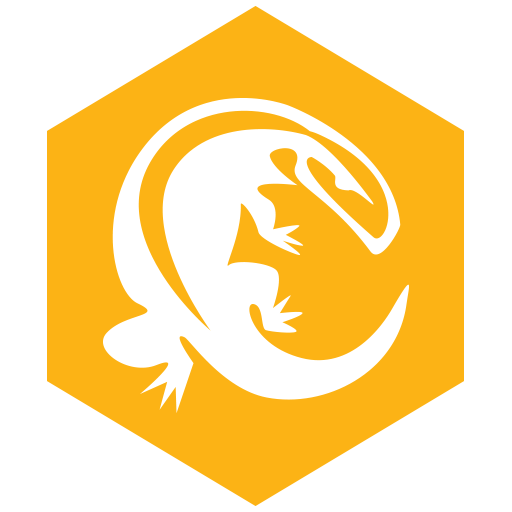

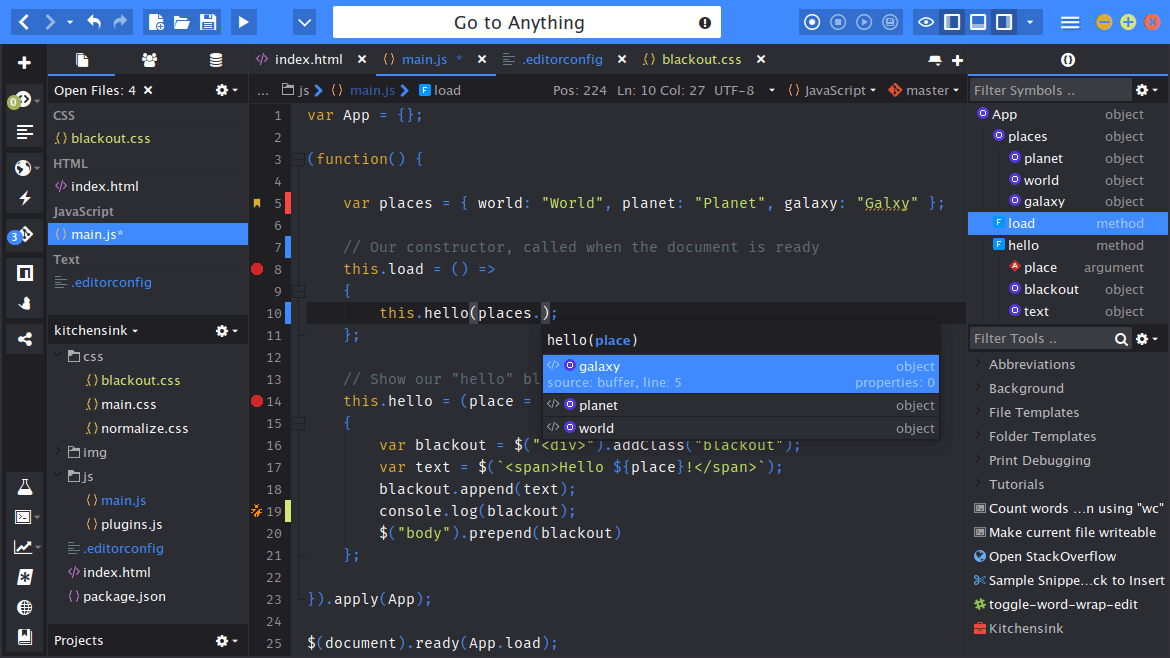
- Screenshot of Komodo IDE 9.2 running on OS X Yosemite
- Developer: ActiveState
- Initial release: May 2000; 25 years ago
- Stable release: 12.0.1 / 10 February 2020
- Repository: github.com/ActiveState/OpenKomodoIDE
- Written in: C++, C, XUL, Perl, Python, JavaScript, CSS
- Operating system: Windows 7 and later; OS X 10.9 to OS X 10.15; Red Hat Enterprise Linux 5 or later; CentOS 6.0 or later; Fedora 18 or later; OpenSUSE 13.1 or later; SUSE Linux Enterprise 11.2 or later; Ubuntu 12.04 or later
- Type: Source code editor, IDE
- License: MPL
- Website: www.komodoide.com

Komodo IDE is an integrated development environment (IDE) for dynamic programming languages. It was introduced in May 2000. Many of Komodo's features are derived from an embedded Python interpreter.

Komodo IDE uses the Mozilla and Scintilla code base, and supports many of the same features, languages and platforms, including the languages Python, Perl, PHP, Ruby, Tcl, SQL, Smarty, CSS, HTML and XML, and the operating systems Linux, OS X, and Windows. The editor component is implemented using the Netscape Plugin Application Programming Interface (NPAPI), with the Scintilla view embedded in the XML User Interface Language (XUL) interface in the same manner as a web browser plugin.

Komodo IDE has an open-source counterpart called Komodo Edit. Much of the code base is shared, although more advanced features are reserved for Komodo IDE such as debugging and unit testing.

Both Komodo Edit and IDE support user customizing via plug-ins and macros. Komodo plug-ins are based on Mozilla Add-ons and extensions can be searched for, downloaded, configured, installed and updated from within the application. Available extensions include a Document Object Model (DOM) inspector, pipe features, additional language support and user interface enhancements.

Komodo IDE has features such as integrated debugger support, DOM viewer, interactive shells, source code control integration, and the ability to select the engine used to run regular expressions, to ensure compatibility with the final deployment target. The commercial version also adds code browsing, a database explorer, collaboration, support for many popular source code control systems, and more. Independent implementations of some of these features, such as the database editor, git support, and remote FTP file access, are available in the free version via Komodo Edit's plugin system.

== History ==
- 5.0: On 2008-11-03, ActiveState Software Inc. announced the release of Komodo IDE 5.0, which was built-on Mozilla 1.9 and Python 2.6.
- With the creation of the subscription-based ActiveState platform in 2018, the Komodo IDE is now available only as part of an ActiveState Platform subscription.
- Development of Komodo Edit and Komodo IDE was officially stopped in 2022, and the IDE was released as open source under the terms of Mozilla Public License.
