= K-Meleon =

Lightweight web browser for Microsoft Windows

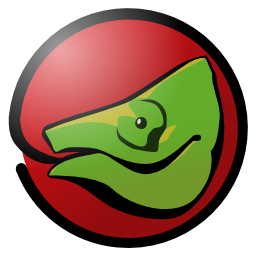

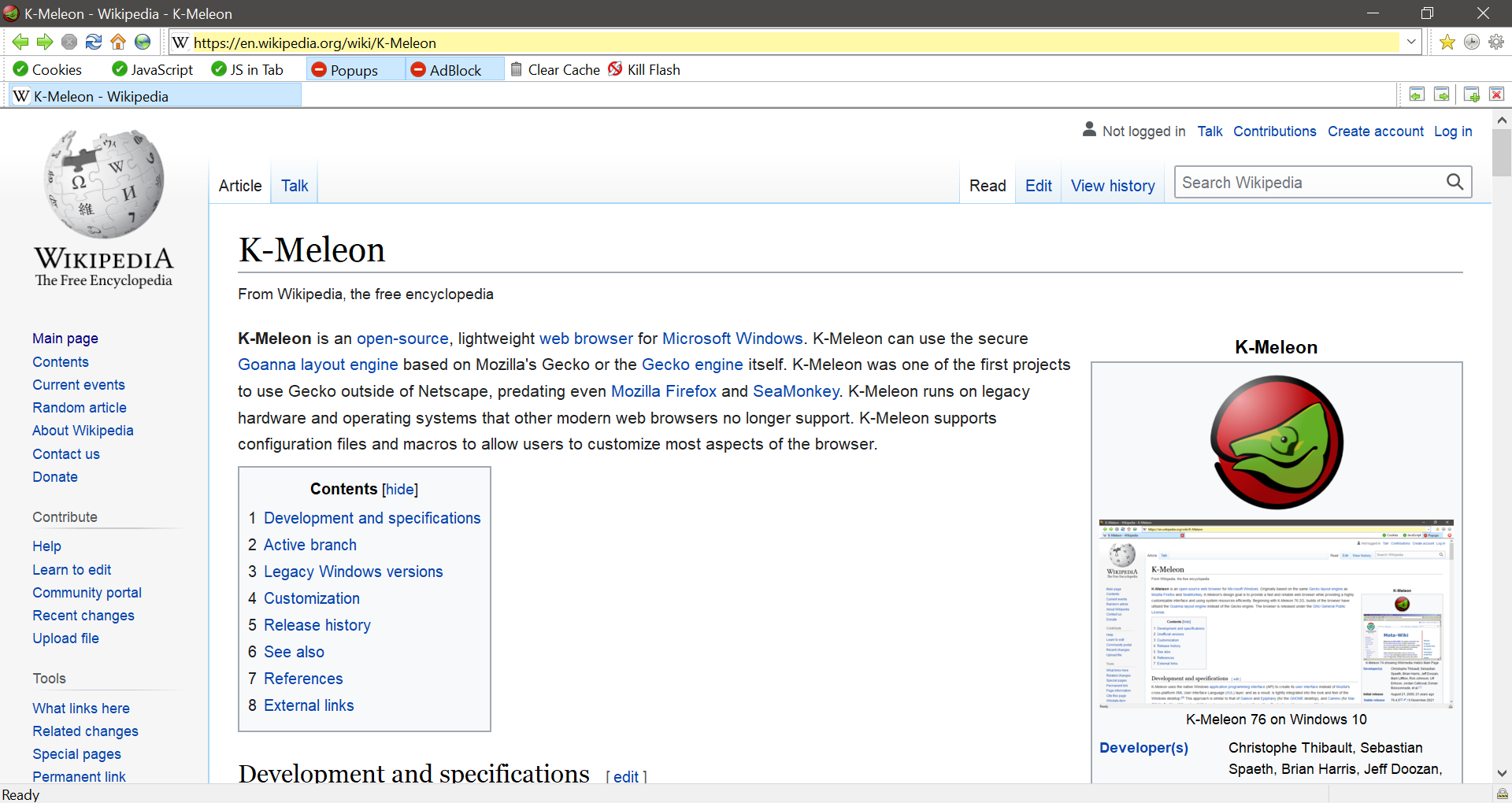
- K-Meleon 76.5.G on Windows 10
- Developers: Christophe Thibault, Sebastian Spaeth, Brian Harris, Jeff Doozan, Mark Liffiton, Rob Johnson, Ulf Erikson, Jordan Callicoat, Dorian Boissonnade, Roy Tam, et al.
- Release: August 21, 2000; 26 years ago
- Stable release: 76.4.7 / 7 April 2023; 3 years ago
- Preview release: 76.5.5 (Goanna 3.6.0) / 2024-10-12
- Written in: C++, JavaScript
- Engines: Goanna, Gecko (former)
- Operating system: Microsoft Windows
- Standards: HTML5, CSS3, Atom
- Available in: 7 languages
- Type: Web browser
- License: GPL
- Website: kmeleonbrowser.org
- Repository: sourceforge.net/p/kmeleon/source/ci/default/tree/

K-Meleon is a free and open-source, lightweight web browser for Microsoft Windows XP. It uses the native Windows API to create its user interface. Early versions of K-Meleon rendered web pages with Gecko, Mozilla's browser layout engine, which Mozilla's browser Firefox and its email client Thunderbird also use. Current versions of K-Meleon use the Goanna layout engine, a fork of Gecko created for the browser Pale Moon. K-Meleon became a popular Windows browser and was available as an optional default browser in Europe via BrowserChoice.eu.

K-Meleon began with the goal of being faster and lighter than Mozilla's original Internet suite. Until 2011, K-Meleon embedded Gecko in a stripped-down interface. Throughout its lifespan, K-Meleon has required very little memory usage. K-Meleon 76 supports discontinued versions of Windows such as Windows XP and Windows Vista, which Firefox has not supported for many years.

Customization is another primary design goal. Users can change the toolbars, menus, and keyboard shortcuts from text-based configuration files. K-Meleon supports macros, which are small browser extensions that users can examine, write, or edit in a text editor. K-Meleon's custom configuration files can trigger macros. Reviews describe the customization features as versatile but intimidating to the average user. Due to its adaptability, K-Meleon was recommended for Internet cafés and libraries in the early 2000s.

== History ==
Christophe Thibault started the K-Meleon project in the 2000s, when many new browsers were launched. To open-source their once-dominant Netscape Communicator Internet suite, Netscape founded the Mozilla project. K-Meleon was one of several browsers to use Mozilla's browser engine Gecko. Thibault designed K-Meleon to combine Gecko with native Windows interface elements, an approach that was less resource-intensive and allowed the browser to blend into its environment.

=== Embedding Gecko ===
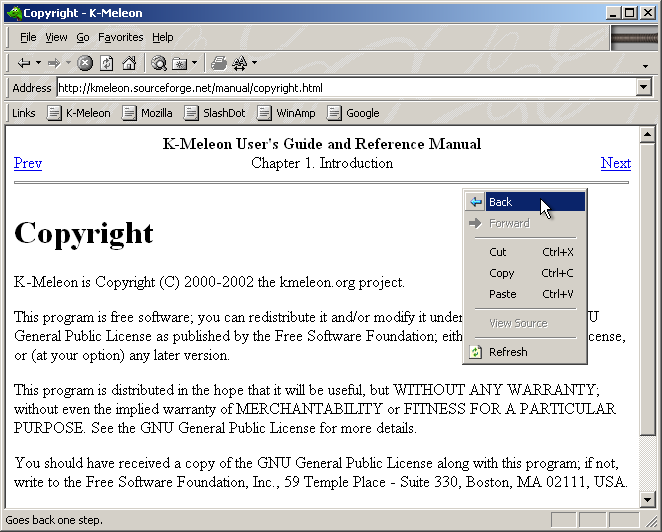
K-Meleon 0.2

Christophe Thibault released K-Meleon 0.1 on August 21, 2000. While working at Nullsoft, Thibault said he created the first simple release to attract attention, during a day off. For the 0.2 release, he implemented features like context menus and moved development to SourceForge to welcome contributions from open-source developers.

Thibault handed the project over to new developers, including Brian Harris, Sebastian Spaeth, Jeff Doozan, and Ulf Erikson, who began implementing browser functions through modular Kplugins. The K-Meleon team released new versions with pop-up blocking and cookie management. These releases introduced text-based configuration files called configs that allowed users to customize the browser or hide interface elements, and a macro language to extend the browser. Early reviews described K-Meleon as small, fast, limited, and visually similar to Internet Explorer.

K-Meleon was built with open-source code from Mozilla but its narrower focus offered advantages over the Mozilla Application Suite, which bundled the browser with applications for email, news, chat, and webpage editing. To create a stand-alone browser, the Galeon project embedded Mozilla's rendering engine. Galeon was released for Linux using GNOME's widget toolkit GTK. K-Meleon brought a similar approach to Windows using the operating system's native application programming interface (API) to create a lightweight user interface (UI). The K-Meleon developers released a stand-alone web browser for Windows two years before the Firefox alpha release. Mozilla created user interfaces via their cross-platform XML User Interface Language (XUL) layer. This technology used Gecko to lay out application interfaces. XUL allowed Mozilla to build one application for multiple operating systems but generated graphical controls that did not match the rest of the system. K-Meleon was smaller and more closely integrated into the Windows desktop than Mozilla's browser, and could use the native bookmarking system to access Internet Explorer's favorites. (Note: This approach of embedding Gecko into a native interface was also used by Camino on macOS.)

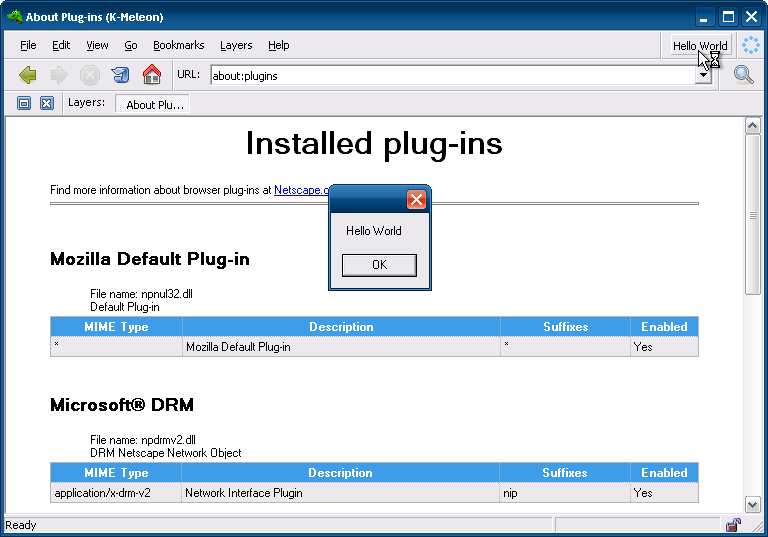
K-Meleon 0.7 with a simple "Hello World" macro, the optional Tango theme, and several NPAPI plugins installed

K-Meleon 0.7 was released with the Mozilla 1.0 engine in October 2002. Despite AOL disbanding upstream parent company Netscape in 2003, the development of K-Meleon continued. Mozilla continued work on Gecko, and K-Meleon was updated with service packs and version 0.8. In 2005, Ulf Erikson announced version 0.9 would be the final version of K-Meleon he would build. He was the project's developer but stated he was no longer using K-Meleon as his primary browser after moving to Linux. In January 2006, Dorian Boissonnade became the lead developer and began working towards a 1.0 release.

K-Meleon 1.0 was released in July 2006 and made the browser fully translatable. (Note: Previous versions could be translated because they were open-source. The source code could be downloaded, the source files translated, the browser code recompiled, and the resulting application distributed under an open-source license.) It stored localizations in separate library-and-config files within existing K-Meleon installations. Parts of the browser could be translated in a text editor. K-Meleon 1.0 maintained support for its existing system of text-based configuration files and introduced a new graphical interface to change preferences from within the browser.

Version 1.1 expanded the macro system. Earlier versions placed all of the macros into a single config file. Initial releases came with fewer than 50 lines of macro code and instructions for end users to create their own macros. Later versions came with over 1,000 lines of macro code, and the macros users wrote and shared online. In response, K-Meleon developers separated macros into modules. Version 1.5 introduced a true tabbed interface. (Note: Previously used in unofficial builds, true tabs supported drag and drop, could have individual close icons, and could be placed on the bottom of the window.)

In Europe, version 1.5 was an optional default Windows browser through Microsoft's browser ballot. Due to accusations of abusing its market position to promote Internet Explorer, Microsoft introduced a browser ballot in the European Economic Area (EEA). By 2010, it offered Windows users a choice of the 12 most popular web browsers, including K-Meleon.

=== 7x releases ===
In 2011, Mozilla ended support for embedding the Gecko layout engine; because K-Meleon had previously relied on this API, the browser's future became uncertain. (Note: The situation also left the future of other embedded Gecko browsers unclear. Camino's developers initially explored transitioning to the WebKit rendering engine. Mozilla later discontinued the Mac-only browser. Marco Gritti, the lead developer of Galeon, had already forked that project to create GNOME Web, which was switched to a WebKit backend. GNOME Web developer Christian Persch described Mozilla's support for embedding of Gecko on Linux as "unmaintained and stagnant".) In 2013, after years without an official, stable release, the K-Meleon group began developing version 74. While Mozilla had ended support for embedding of Gecko, it maintained a technology called XULRunner. XULRunner was a stand-alone implementation of the Gecko engine designed to launch applications. K-Meleon 74 used XULRunner instead of Mozilla's deprecated embedding software. Outside the new engine, version 74 brought small improvements, including better CPU use and minor bug fixes.

K-Meleon 75 included a spelling checker, form auto-completion, and a new skin system. Boissonnade began work on version 76 but suffered a hard disk drive failure during beta testing.

=== Goanna branch ===
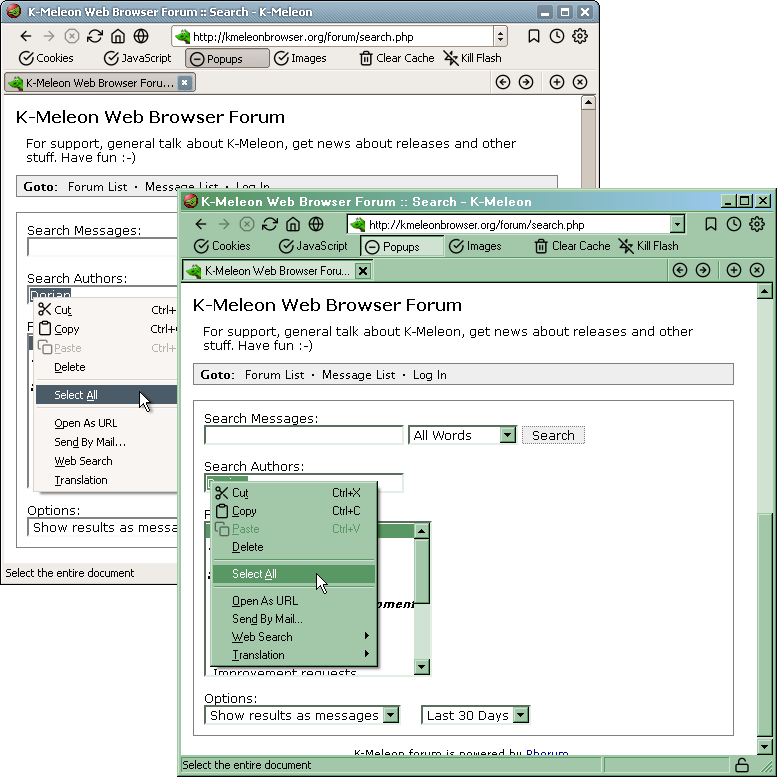
Two screenshots of K-Meleon 76 with the same K-Meleon theme but different system themes

Active development on K-Meleon takes place using Goanna, a fork of Gecko created for the browser Pale Moon. With Firefox Quantum, Mozilla rewrote large parts of its browser engine. In 2017, Roy Tam forked K-Meleon 76 to run on Goanna. The project's former lead developer Boissonnade wrote; "Thanks for taking care of that little lizard [after I] left it". K-Meleon on Goanna remains compatible with deprecated versions of Windows and can run with smaller amounts of RAM than those required by mainstream web browsers. In a 2025 comparison of 12 low resource browsers, K-Meleon had the lowest memory usage.

K-Meleon was updated on a rolling release schedule. By default, the browser is a multi-lingual portable application that can directly run from the host computer or removable media. It is also included in the PortableApps.com repository. By 2023, K-Meleon was not compatible with major web apps and social media sites. As of October 2024, the final planned release for that branch was version 76.5.5.

Boissonnade released an experimental version of K-Meleon in October 2026 that could build around the current version of Goanna.

== Customization ==
Customization of K-Meleon's interface is possible using text-format configuration files called configs. The menus, keyboard shortcuts, and more can all be customized via K-Meleon's configuration files. These configs can call upon macros, a type of extension that can be opened in a text editor.

A simple "Hello, World!" program could be written in K-Meleon's macro language that would pop up a small window with the message "Hello world!".

HelloWorld{
        alert("Hello world!");
}

To trigger the macro, a keyboard accelerator could be created by adding the code below to the accelerator config, causing the macro to launch if the Ctrl, Alt, and H keys are pressed at the same time.

CTRL ALT H = macros(HelloWorld)

Custom toolbars offer more options, but the syntax is similar. The example below would create a new toolbar with a button to trigger a macro.

NewToolbar{
   !NewButton{
	   macros(HelloWorld)
   }
}

This combination of configs and macro modules provides control over much of the browser. It also creates a learning curve for customization that is not present in most browsers. A CNET review criticized K-Meleon because it "requires some knowledge of computer code to get the most out of it". Popular browsers use systems like WebExtensions, where there is a separation between users and extension developers.

Because of its flexibility, K-Meleon was useful for environments in which the browser needed to be customized for public use, such as libraries and Internet cafés. It allowed administrators to hide some features from patrons. For example, a library could hide interface elements like the address bar or limit the computer's access to an online resource like the library catalog.

== Legacy Windows versions ==
K-Meleon supports a range of legacy software and hardware. Version 76 supports Windows XP (2001) and Windows Vista (2006). Windows XP and its Windows Embedded POSReady 2009 variant have been unsupported since 2019. (Note: ReactOS, the open-source implementation of Windows, only targets compatibility up to the discontinued Windows Server 2003.) The latest major browser releases to support these operating systems are Microsoft's Internet Explorer 8 (2014), Google Chrome 49.0.2623.112 (2016), and Mozilla Firefox 52.9.0 (2018).

Web browsers cannot access secure websites if they do not support Transport Layer Security (TLS) encryption. As of 2018, most major web sites use TLS encryption via HTTPS. (Note: Popular browsers like Chrome, Edge, Safari, and Internet Explorer rely on the operating system for client certificates. Mozilla software can use client certificates directly from the browser.) Early versions of K-Meleon for Windows 2000 and Windows 9X receive occasional updates for TLS certificates. K-Meleon 74 can access secure websites on Windows 2000 using an old version of the Goanna engine combined with up-to-date ciphers. K-Meleon 1.5 can run on Windows 95, Windows 98, and Windows Me. Occasional TLS updates allow version 1.5 to access secure websites.

== Release history ==
K-Meleon, which was first released in 2000, has been under development for over 20 years and is still maintained. The most-recent version K-Meleon 76 is updated on a rolling release schedule. All versions of K-Meleon are written for Microsoft Windows operating systems. (Note: K-Meleon can run on POSIX-compliant systems if they have an implementation of the Windows API like the Wine compatibility layer.)

Complete K-Meleon release history
Version	Initial Release	Latest Update	Gecko Version	Notes
0.1	Aug 21, 2000	Aug 21, 2000	M17	
0.2	Nov 26, 2000	Jan 29, 2001	M18	(Note: Version 0.2 is the first version hosted at SourceForge and introduced right-click context menus.)
0.3	Feb 13, 2001	Feb 13, 2001	0.8	(Note: Version 0.3 is a rewrite using MfcEmbed instead of WinEmbed and the BCG Library. It introduced Kplugin support for menus and toolbars, a preferences dialog, customizable menus and accelerator keys, basic authentication, page source view, and the option to save files to disk.)
0.4	May 11, 2001	May 11, 2001	0.9	(Note: Version 0.4 introduced support for Netscape bookmarks, full-screen display, the macro extension Kplugin, the history Kplugin, icons in menus, cache support, configurable cookie and image settings, and the option to disable Java and JavaScript.)
0.5	Sep 27, 2001	Sep 27, 2001	0.9.4	
0.6	Oct 30, 2001	Oct 30, 2001	0.9.5	
0.7	Oct 31, 2002	Feb 12, 2003	1.2b	(Note: Version 0.7 introduced layered windows for "tabbed browsing", support for Opera bookmarks, automatic detection of popular third-party (NPAPI) plugins, text zoom, print preview, page setup, type ahead find, and skin support.)
0.8	Nov 10, 2003	Dec 23, 2003	1.5	
0.9	Jan 18, 2005	Apr 25, 2006	1.7.13	(Note: Version 0.9 introduced the Privacy Kplugin, the Flashblock extension, an RSS feed reader, and a new default skin (Phoenity). It was updated with community-driven Gecko updates.)
1.0	Jul 15, 2006	Sep 22, 2006	1.8.0.7	(Note: Version 1.0 introduced full localization support, the first official localization (German), updates to the URL bar, configurable download options, a XUL-based advanced preferences panel, Gecko updates, improvements in Unicode handling for macros and menus, and a new default RSS/Atom feed reader (NewsFox).)
1.1	May 22, 2007	Jul 18, 2008	1.8.1.17	(Note: Version 1.1 expanded multi-language support. It introduced several official localizations, modular macros, the session saver Kplugin, new customization of search engines and mouse gestures, multi-user configuration files, Gecko updates, and the update checker Kplugin.)
1.5	Aug 8, 2008	Dec 9, 2022	1.8.1.24	(Note: Version 1.5 replaced the native preferences panel with the XUL-based former advanced preferences panel. It introduced true tabs instead of layered windows, new configuration options, a Unicode build for Windows NT, a non-Unicode build for Windows 9X, and Gecko updates.)
1.6	Nov 14, 2010	Dec 12, 2010	1.9.1.20	
74.0	Sep 8, 2014	Aug 14, 2021	24.7	(Note: Version 74 transitioned away from embedding Gecko to update the browser engine. The jump in version number is related to K-Meleon's user agent string.)
75.0	Nov 25, 2014	Jun 24, 2015	31.5	(Note: Version 75 introduced Gecko updates, an expanded JSBridge, an expanded macro language, support for "about:" pages, new spellcheck features, and a shorter privacy bar using text. It enabled the container for Adobe Flash by default.)
75.1	Sep 19, 2015	Dec 14, 2022	31.8	
76.0 RC	May 2, 2016	Dec 20, 2016	38.8	(Note: Version 76 never had an official stable release, and RC2 was only offered in portable form.)
76.G	Nov 28, 2017	Dec 15, 2018	Goanna 3.x	(Note: Version 76 on Goanna (also referred to as KM-Goanna, 76.G or 76G) is a new branch that switched from Gecko to Goanna.)
76.2.G	Jan 10, 2019	Aug 22, 2020	Goanna 3.4.6	
76.3.G	Aug 29, 2020	Feb 5, 2021	Goanna 3.4.6	
76.4.G	Feb 12, 2021	Apr 7, 2023	Goanna 3.4.6	
76.5.G	Dec 1, 2024	Oct 10, 2024	Goanna 3.6.0	
Notes General references for this table include K-Meleon file releases, release notes, changelogs, and the Announcements forum.

== See also ==
- Comparison of feed aggregators
- Comparison of lightweight web browsers
- Comparison of web browsers
- List of feed aggregators
- List of web browsers
