= Firefox Environment Backup Extension =

Firefox Environment Backup Extension (or FEBE) is a Pale Moon browser extension for backing up and restoring user profiles. It was compatible with Firefox version 1.5 - 57-pre. However, Firefox profiles may be backed up manually. The source files are distributed under MPL-2.0.

Among other settings, it handles bookmarks, history, extensions and passwords. The extension offers several configuration options to customize the backup tasks, and can also do scheduled backups.
