= Basilisk (web browser) =

Free and open-source web browser

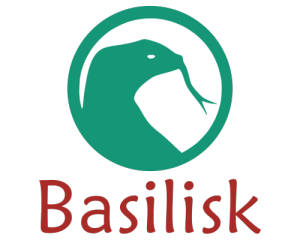

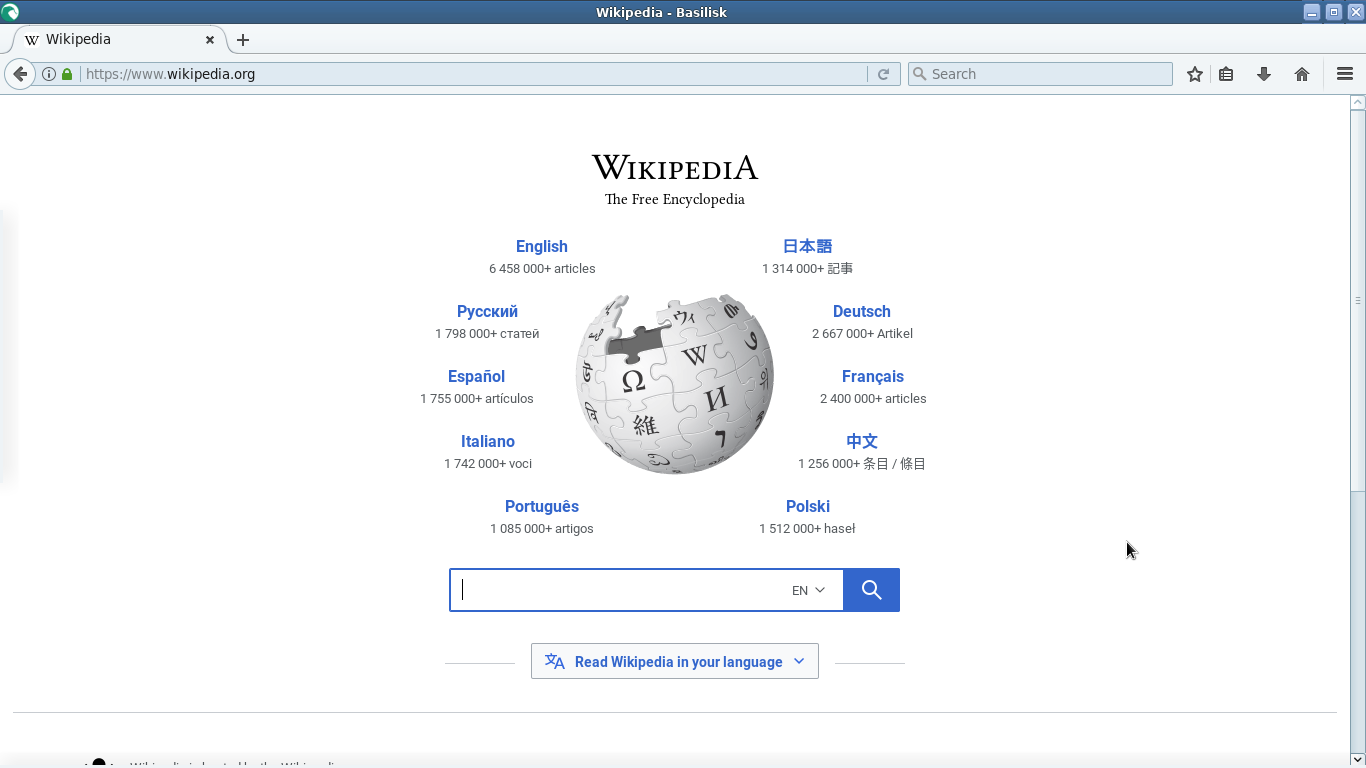
- A screenshot of Basilisk version 2022.08.06
- Original author: M.C. Straver
- Developer: Basilisk Development Team
- Release: 17 December 2018; 7 years ago
- Stable release: 2026.06.12 / 14 June 2026; 4 months ago
- Written in: C++, C, Cascading Style Sheets, JavaScript, XML User Interface Language
- Engines: Goanna, SpiderMonkey
- Operating system: Windows 7 or later Linux; FreeBSD macOS
- Platform: IA-32, x86-64, ARM64, LoongArch64
- Type: Web browser
- License: Source code: MPL-2.0; Binaries: Proprietary freeware, or MPL-2.0 if branding is removed
- Website: basilisk-browser.org
- Repository: repo.palemoon.org/Basilisk-Dev/Basilisk

Basilisk is a free and open-source web browser available for Windows, Linux, and with experimental support for FreeBSD and macOS. Basilisk is an updated fork of Firefox designed to look and feel similar to versions before the underlying backend was changed in version 57.

== History ==
Basilisk was first announced in 2017 by the developer behind Pale Moon, M.C. Straver, as a fork of Mozilla Firefox in order to serve as a basis for the Unified XUL Platform, with the developer calling it a "reference application for development of the XUL platform." The Unified XUL Platform is a fork of the backend of Firefox before version 57, which the developer forked because it dropped support for classic Firefox extensions, XUL, and XPCOM. Because of this, it uses the same rendering engine as Pale Moon, Goanna, which is a fork of Firefox's Gecko rendering engine. The browser was later released on December 17, 2018.

The browser was able to use WebExtensions and classic Firefox add-ons, but the support for WebExtensions was dropped in 2019.

M.C. Straver announced on the Pale Moon forums that he was ending support for the web browser in 2021 as it had become redundant to Pale Moon and offered it for sale. The rights were purchased and development was later picked up by a developer under the name of Basilisk-Dev in 2022. The browser remains open source.

== Features ==
Basilisk uses the Australis theme used by Firefox from versions 29 to 56. It uses the Goanna rendering engine. The browser supports modern web browsing, including support for ECMAScript 6 on release, TLS 1.3, NPAPI plugins, classic Firefox add-ons, ALSA on Linux, WebAssembly (WASM), and allows for unsigned extensions. It also shares features that versions of Firefox before version 57 had.

Basilisk previously supported WebExtensions, but support for them was dropped in 2019 to focus on classic Firefox extensions.

== Reception ==
The browser has been noted as lightweight, as it only requires 1 GB of RAM as a baseline. gHacks stated that early versions were similar in performance to Firefox 52 ESR and that it performed similarly on the HTML5test, and praised its support for classic Firefox add-ons. It's Foss stated that it is "a great option for users who want the classic look and feel of Mozilla’s Firefox (before the Quantum update) without comprising[sic] on the modern web support," but noted that some sites such as YouTube detected it as an obsolete browser and that "you should not rely on it as the only browser to use."

== See also ==
- Waterfox
- K-Meleon
- SeaMonkey
- List of web browsers
- History of the web browser
- Firefox version history
