= Jetpack (Firefox project) =

Mozilla project

- Developer: Mozilla Corporation/Mozilla Foundation
- Stable release: 1.14 / March 26, 2013
- Repository: github.com/mozilla/addon-sdk
- Written in: HTML, CSS and JavaScript
- Operating system: Cross-platform
- Platform: Mozilla
- Type: Software development kit (SDK)
- License: MPL 2.0
- Website: https://addons.mozilla.org/en-US/developers/

Jetpack was a working group which wrote a software development kit for Firefox add-ons. They produced the Add-on SDK, a set of APIs, a runtime, and a command-line tool for creating and running add-ons, and the Add-on Builder, a Web-based integrated development environment which used the SDK.

Add-ons developed with the SDK were written in HTML, CSS, and JavaScript using CommonJS conventions. They did not require the user to restart Firefox when they were installed or uninstalled. The SDK's APIs were high-level, task-oriented, and designed to insulate developers from changes across Firefox versions.

Mozillians running the project made a tool called the Jetpack Prototype. APIs provided by the Jetpack Prototype were not compatible with the Add-on SDK.
