= LibreWolf =

Web browser fork based on Firefox

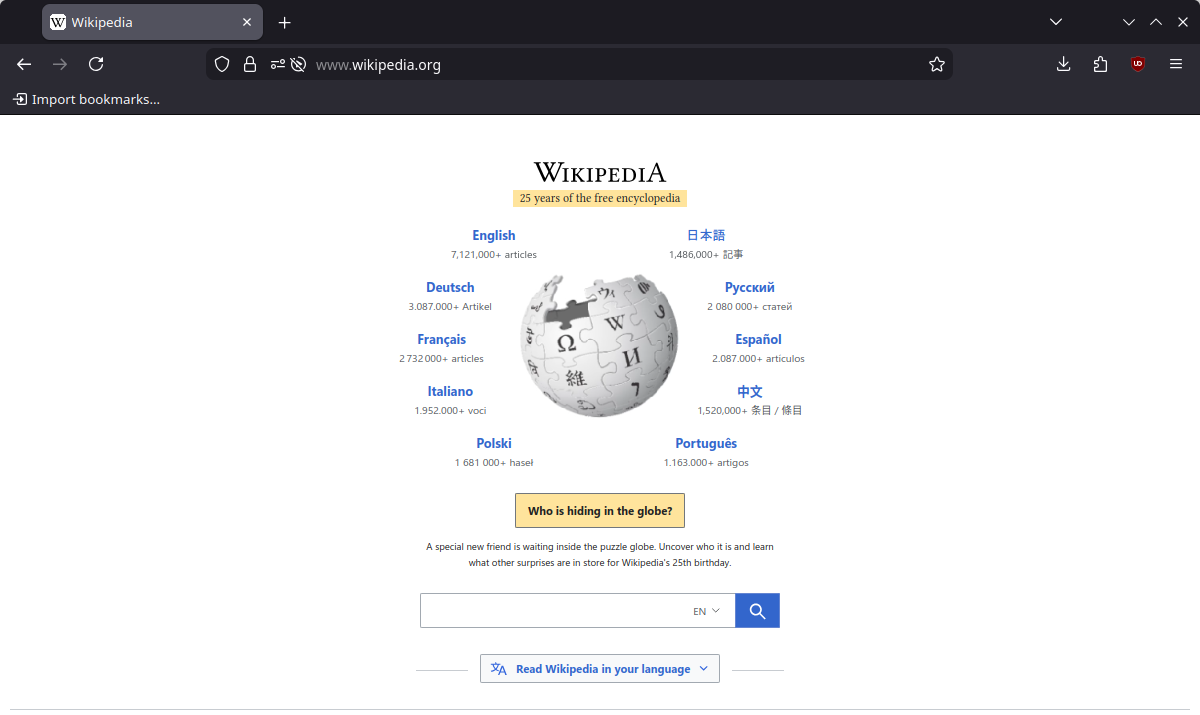
- LibreWolf 147 with Wikipedia.org open
- Developer: LibreWolf Community
- Release: Linux: March 7, 2020; 6 years ago; Windows: February 21, 2021; 5 years ago; macOS: April 12, 2021; 5 years ago
- Stable release: 156.0.1-1 / 22 September 2026; 55 days ago
- Engines: Gecko, Quantum, and SpiderMonkey
- Operating system: Linux; macOS 10.15 and later; Windows 10 and later
- Type: Web browser
- License: Source code: MPL 2.0; Website: GNU AGPL 3.0
- Website: librewolf.net
- Repository: librewolf.dev/librewolf; codeberg.org/librewolf

LibreWolf is a free and open-source fork of Firefox, with an emphasis on privacy and security. It is licensed under the MPL 2.0.

== Development ==
LibreWolf was initially released for Linux-based desktop operating systems on March 7, 2020. The goal of the LibreWolf project was to create a more privacy-focused version of Firefox. A community-maintained version for Windows was released a year later, with a macOS port released soon after.

== Features ==
LibreWolf does not include telemetry. Certain features such as auto-updating and WebGL are disabled by default. It does not have sponsored shortcuts.

By default, LibreWolf deletes the user’s cookies and history when the browser is closed, but that feature can be disabled. LinuxSecurity noted that LibreWolf may not have full compatibility with some websites.

By default, Firefox Sync is disabled for LibreWolf, though it is possible to enable it in the browser’s settings.

PrivacyTests data as of June 5, 2022

According to the website PrivacyTests.org in 2022, LibreWolf, along with Brave Browser and Tor Browser, had the most privacy protection compared to other browsers.

In most cases, LibreWolf was found to have similar performance to Firefox; however, LibreWolf's stronger focus on privacy and security features may slightly impact web optimization.

In December 2025, the developers stated that they will not support features related to generative AI, and will remove those already present in Firefox.

== See also ==
- Browser security
- Gecko (software)
- GNU IceCat
- Pale Moon
- Waterfox
