= Mozilla Archive Format =

Legacy compressed Zip file format

- Filename extension: .maff
- Internet media type: application/x-maff
- Magic number: 04 03 4b 50
- Developed by: Christopher Ottley, Paolo Amadini
- Initial release: 4 May 2004
- Type of format: Web-archive, data compression
- Container for: Web-pages
- Extended from: ZIP
- Open format?: Yes for the Specification of MAFF file format; (MAF Firefox Addon) under MPL 1.1, GPL 2.0, LGPL 2.1, or any later version of these licenses; Documentation is under Copyright;
- Website: maf.mozdev.org/maff-file-format.html/

The Mozilla Archive Format (MAFF) is a legacy Web archive file format that was provided by Firefox through an extension, used to store one or more web pages with their associated audio, video, and other related web resources to a single file. Unlike MHTML, which uses MIME encoding within a single HTML file, MAFF compresses the page into a Zip container file.

The extension supported versions of Firefox from 2007 to 2017 but not later, and there are no plans to update it. It continued to be supported in Cyberfox and Waterfox, forks of Firefox that try to keep features removed from Firefox like the traditional extension API. Browser extension WebScrapBook (with assistant PyWebScrapBook), available for Firefox 57+ and Chromium-based browsers, supports saving and opening MAFF files. Pale Moon extension MozArchiver, a fork of the original extension, provides the same support for Pale Moon 26.0 and newer.

Existing files in the discontinued .maff format can be accessed by extracting the internal folders and files with an unarchiver such as 7-Zip. It also allows for automatic processing, e.g. as Zip-type in local search machines (like DocFetcher). Pale Moon allows .maff files to be opened in Microsoft Windows.

== Format licensing ==
MAFF is an open file format. The file format specification is published.

== See also ==
- Data URI scheme
- Microsoft Compiled HTML Help
- MHTML
- Webarchive
