= Internet archive (disambiguation) =

Internet Archive is a nonprofit organization based in San Francisco, California, United States.

Internet archive may also refer to:

- Marxists Internet Archive

== See also ==
- Web archive (disambiguation)
