= Songbird (software) =

Music player

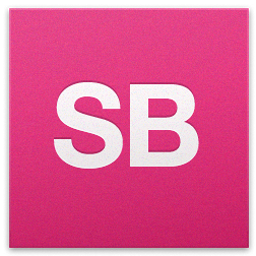

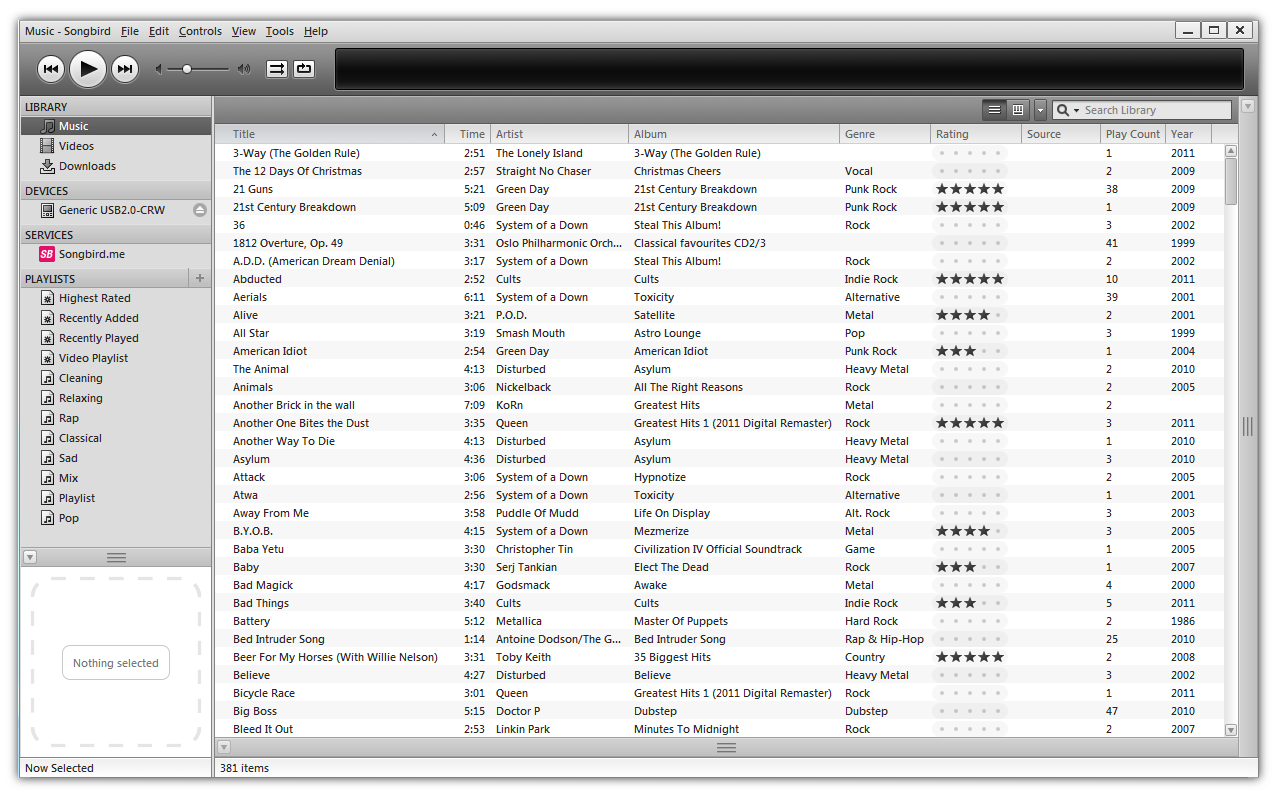
- Songbird 2.0.0 on Windows 7
- Developer(s): Pioneers of the Inevitable aka POTI Inc.
- Initial release: 8 February 2006; 19 years ago
- Final release: 2.2.0, Build 2453 / 4 February 2013
- Preview release: None [±]
- Operating system: Windows XP and later; macOS; Android (removed from Play Store, not open-source); iOS (not open-source); Linux and Solaris (unofficial)
- Platform: IA-32; x86-64; PowerPC (unofficial)
- Available in: 98 languages
- Type: Media player
- License: GNU GPLv2 with exceptions; Android client closed source
- Website: getsongbird.net

Songbird is a discontinued music player originally released in early 2006 with the stated mission "to incubate Songbird, the first Web player, to catalyze and champion a diverse, open Media Web".

Songbird utilizes the cross-platform frameworks Mozilla XULRunner and GStreamer media framework. Songbird runs on Windows and macOS. In 2012, an Android version and an iOS version were released. Songbird at one point also supported Solaris and Linux, but this support was dropped. As a result, users forked Songbird and created a Windows, Mac, and Linux compatible derivative under the name Nightingale.

Songbird announced on 14 June 2013 that it would stop all operations and shut down by 28 June. The company was unable to fund further business operations and as a result, all operations and associated services were discontinued.

== Features ==
- Multi-platform compatibility with Windows XP, Vista and Mac OS X v10.5 (x86, x86-64).
- Ability to play multiple audio formats, such as MP3, AAC, Ogg Vorbis, FLAC, Apple Lossless and WMA
- Ability to play Apple FairPlay-encoded audio on Windows and Mac platforms via hooks into QuickTime (authorization takes place in iTunes)
- Ability to play Windows Media DRM audio on Windows platforms
- A skinnable interface, with skins called "feathers"
- Media files stored on pages viewed in the browser show up as playable files in Songbird
- MP3 file download
- Ability to subscribe to MP3 blogs as playlists
- Ability to build custom mixes
- Ability to scan the user's computer for all audio files and add them to a local library
- A configurable and collapsible graphical user interface similar to iTunes, and mini-player mode
- Keyboard shortcuts and media keyboard support
- Automatic updates
- Last.fm integration via a plugin, complete with love/hate buttons
- Insound.com and HypeMachine integration
- Microsoft MTP compatible device support
- Ability to edit and save metadata tags
- Gapless Playback & ReplayGain
- Watch Folders
- Media Importing / Exportings (from and to iTunes)
- Automatic Library Files Organization

== Add-ons ==
=== Extensions ===
Users can add features and change functionality in Songbird by installing extensions. Extensions are similar to the Extensions for the Firefox browser and can be easily ported. Community coded extensions are available on Songbird's addons support page. Known community designed extensions are: Qloud Tagging & Search, eMusic Integration, iTunes Importer, Artist Tracker, Library File Organizer, Audioscrobbler Notifier, Wikipedia Artist Display, SHOUTcast Radio Directory, UnPlug, Adblock Plus, Taglib metadata handler, ChatZilla, and FoxyProxy.

=== Skins ===
Skins are referred to as "feathers" in Songbird and give users and artists the ability to change the look of Songbird via an extension which generates a default skin. Using CSS (and optionally XUL), and an image manipulation program such as Photoshop or GIMP, users are then able to make Songbird look however they want.

== History ==
Songbird was founded by Rob Lord and developed by Pioneers of the Inevitable (with members who previously developed for both Winamp and the Yahoo! Music Engine).

In January 2010, Philips announced they would ship a personalized version of Songbird with some of their line of portable audio/video players.

On 2 April 2010, it was announced that official Linux support would end with Songbird version 1.7.2. POTI Inc. would instead focus on its Windows and Mac OS X versions of Songbird, providing only unofficial support for Linux releases.

Sometime during late 2012 or early 2013, Songbird's public SVN was taken down, along with their wiki and other source code related utilities. A survey later sent out via Twitter by Songbird suggested that POTI was closing the desktop player source code, planning to later sell an updated version, fixing many outstanding bugs and feature requests by users who had been ignored for years.

Color	Meaning
Red	Old release
Yellow	Unreleased, internal milestone
Green	Current release
Blue	Future release

Version	Release date	Codename	Significant changes
0.1	8 February 2006	Hilda	
0.1.1	22 February 2006		UI fixes.; More file types supported.
0.2 RC1	26 September 2006		Cross-platform; Windows 2000, XP; Mac OS X (PPC, Intel); Linux (Intel); 30+ languages; New features; Bug fixes; Automatic updates
0.2	17 October 2006		Cross-platform compatibility.; Multi-language support.
0.2.5	28 February 2007		Windows Media DRM audio playback.; FairPlay audio playback.; USB mass storage device support.; iPod device support.; Automatic locales downloading.; Improved OS integration.
0.3	30 October 2007	Bowie	Tabbed browsing.; API overhaul.; Updated to Gecko 1.9
0.3.1	6 November 2007		Six major bug fixes.
0.4	27 December 2007	Cher	Display panes.
0.5	26 March 2008	Dokken	Media library API.; MTP device support.
0.6	13 June 2008	Eno	Memory and performance improvements.; Write metadata back to the file.
0.6.1	25 June 2008		Three major bug fixes.
0.7	20 August 2008	Fugazi	Layout and feather changes; Smart playlists; Drag & drop; Dropped support for Mac OS X PPC
1.0	2 December 2008	Genesis	GStreamer media core on all platforms
1.1.1	10 March 2009	Hendrix	Watch folders for changes and auto-import media; Fetching Album Art; Playback normalization (ReplayGain); Improved sorting; Gapless MP3 playback via file metadata
1.1.2	9 April 2009	Hootie	Bugfix release
1.2	18 June 2009	Isan	Automatically Organize Library Files; 2-way Sync with iTunes; Last.fm Radio; 10-band Equalizer
1.3	—	Jackson 5	Dropped iPod device support; Mass Storage Class device support; Playback of additional formats; Metadata support for MP4 and ASF files; Transcoding to MP3 or WMA formats
1.4	December 2009	Kanye	MP3 encoding; Mobile device firmware updates; CD ripping; CD information lookup; Notification for un-synced DRM controlled media
1.4.3	23 December 2009	KoЯn	New Feather (Purple Rain); Addons Visual Redesign; New First Run Bundle; Additional Device Support; Critical Bug Fixes; Easily Resizable Display Panes
1.5	—	Led Zeppelin	Video Library; Video Playback; Video Metadata; Video Device Sync; Performance and Stability; Vendor Rebasing; General Build Improvements; Video Transcoding; Windows 7 Support
1.6.0	—	Madonna	Video Transcoding; Video Transcoding Device Support; Device Video Compatibility; Firmware Support; Import Network Settings; Gracenote metadata; Performance and Stability; Codec Profiling; Startup Localization; Some Firefox Addons Start Working on Songbird
1.7.0	—	Nirvana	Photo Device Synchronization; AAC Decoder; Windows 7 Support; Additional Device Support; Performance and Stability; Ability to subscribe to new podcasts removed.
1.7.2	3 June 2010	NOFX	Additional Encoding Support; Additional Device Support; SD Card Support; Video Window; Performance and Stability; Official Linux support dropped
1.8.0	2 September 2010	Orbital	New Device Support; Mac USB/MSC Support; Mac Partner Integration; Service Pane Cleanup; Device Synchronization and UI Cleanup; AAC Encoding; Stream Transcoding (Backend); Performance and Stability
1.9.3	9 February 2011	Pink Floyd	Online Media Store Integration; Play Queue Addon; CD Rip for Mac; Firmware Updates; Seamless Update for Partner Releases; XULRunner 1.9.2; Misc Minor Projects; 7digital Addon Rewrite (new API); Performance and Stability
1.10.1	1 November 2011	Qbert	Device 2-Way Sync; Performance and Stability
1.10.2	25 January 2012		Playlist and track sync with Android devices has been improved.; Added official support for Google/Samsung Nexus S, Samsung Galaxy SII, HTC Evo 3D, and Galaxy Nexus.; The issue with WMA tracks not being playable after updating to 1.10.1 should be resolved.; When creating a Smart Playlist with the criteria of "Playlist is Library", Songbird no longer crashes
1.10.3	22 May 2012		?
2.0.0	8 June 2012		New skin matches the Songbird.me web app and updated Android skin
2.1	31 October 2012		?
2.2	15 February 2013		?

== See also ==
- List of feed aggregators
- Comparison of feed aggregators
- Nightingale, a community-supported fork of Songbird
- Qtrax, a client based on Songbird.
