= XULRunner =

Standalone software package of Mozilla platform

- Developers: Mozilla Foundation and community
- Initial release: February 2006
- Final release: 41.0.2 / October 15, 2015; 10 years ago
- Written in: C++, XUL, XBL, JavaScript
- Operating system: Cross-platform
- Type: Runtime environment
- License: MPL
- Website: developer.mozilla.org/en/XULRunner

XULRunner is a discontinued, packaged version of the Mozilla platform to enable standalone desktop application development using XUL, developed by Mozilla. It replaced the Gecko Runtime Environment, a stalled project with a similar purpose. The first stable developer preview of XULRunner was released in February 2006, based on the Mozilla 1.8 code base. Mozilla stopped supporting the development of XULrunner in July 2015.

XULRunner was a "technology experiment", not a shipped product, meaning there were no official XULRunner releases, only stable builds based on the same code as a corresponding Firefox release.

== Software architecture ==
XULRunner is a runtime that can be used to bootstrap multiple XUL + XPCOM applications that are equal in capabilities to Firefox and Thunderbird.

XULRunner stores a variety of configuration data (bookmarks, cookies, contacts etc.) in internally managed SQLite databases, and even offer an add-on to manage SQLite databases.

== Uses ==
Mozilla Firefox, Mozilla Thunderbird, Nightingale, Songbird, Flickr Uploadr, SeaMonkey, Conkeror, Sunbird, Miro, Joost, and TomTom Home 2.0 ran on XULRunner. Starting with version 3.0, Mozilla Firefox uses a "private" XULRunner, meaning the framework is installed locally in the application directory.

Kiwix, an offline browser for Wikipedia and Project Gutenberg, used XULRunner until 2017.

The Google AdWords Editor used XULRunner until 2010, as did Evergreen ILS, an open-source library automation system.

The fourth version of the video game series Simon the Sorcerer, Simon the Sorcerer 4: Chaos Happens, uses XULRunner.

In addition, the XULRunner package provided access to ActiveX Control functionality previously found in a (now defunct) third-party ActiveX Control built off the Mozilla source code. Applications using this application programming interface (API) may have function with XULRunner installed and registered.

Starting with Lotus Notes version 8.5.1, IBM deployed XULRunner to provide Notes client support for XPages applications.

XULJet was an open-source JavaScript framework for XULRunner.

== Deprecation ==
In January 2014, dropping XULRunner support was discussed by Mozilla developers. In July 2015, Mozilla stopped supporting the development of XULrunner, and the community page has been taken down. As of the beginning of 2016, it had been dropped from the package database of most Linux distributions, including Gentoo, Debian, and Ubuntu.

XULRunner can still be installed separately, and many XULRunner-dependent applications can be switched over fairly easily. Also developing and running XULRunner apps is still possible through Firefox as well as previous or custom builds of XULRunner. However, its disappearance has caused some dependent packages to be removed from package databases.

Despite this deprecation, the latest versions of Firefox and Thunderbird can still run XULRunner applications with the -app command line argument.

== See also ==
- Mozilla application framework (XPFE)
- Mozilla Prism
- Gecko (software)
- HTML Application
- Adobe Integrated Runtime (AIR)
- Chromium Embedded Framework
- Electron (software framework)
