= Web Archive (file format) =

Safari's Web archive file format

- Filename extension: .webarchive
- Internet media type: application/x-webarchive
- Uniform Type Identifier (UTI): com.apple.webarchive
- Type of format: web page file archive
- Extended from: Apple Binary Property List

Web Archive (stylized by Apple as Web archive, extension .webarchive) is a Web archive file format available on Apple devices for saving and reviewing complete web pages using the Safari web browser. The Web Archive format differs from a standalone HTML file because it also saves linked files such as images, CSS, and JavaScript. The Web Archive format is a concatenation of source files with filenames saved in the binary plist format using NSKeyedArchiver.

Support for Web Archive documents was added in Safari 4 Beta on Windows and was included in subsequent versions, until its discontinuation in 2012. Safari on iOS and iPadOS (iPhone and iPad) has supported Web Archive files since at least iOS 13. Previously there was a third party iOS app called Web Archive Viewer that provided this functionality.

== Usage ==
- A version of the Web Archive format is used to bundle whole music albums and movies with extra content and menus inside iTunes LP and Extras.
- Web Archive files were automatically generated for ads submitted to Apple's iAd advertising platform.
- The WebKit framework's WebArchive class is used to simplify cutting-and-pasting with whole or partial web pages.

== Vulnerability ==
In February 2013, a vulnerability with the Web Archive format was discovered and reported by Joe Vennix, a Metasploit Project developer. The exploit allows an attacker to send a crafted Web Archive to a user containing code to access cookies, local files, and other data. Apple's response to the report was that it will not fix the bug, most likely because it requires action on the users' part in opening the file.

== Converting for other browsers ==
Workarounds to allow the file to be viewed in other browsers are possible, though specific webpage contents may hinder this process. This requires one of the free tools WebArchive Folderizer (for OS X 10.2 and higher) or WebArchive Extractor (for OS X 10.4.3 and higher). Webarchives can be converted to WARC using the National Library of Norway's Warchaeology set of tools.

== Alternatives ==
MAFF is an open format (with a published specification) that enables saving of whole webpages in a single file. It was supported by Firefox, using an extension. Other web browsers use the MHTML format or do the equivalent by saving a directory of inline resources (usually images) alongside the HTML file, sometimes compressed, like the .war format used by Konqueror (tar+gzip or tar+bzip2). Safari does not support these alternative archive formats.

For archiving entire websites, the Internet Archive has developed the Web ARChive (WARC) format which was standardized by ISO.

HTMLD (HTML Directory) is a NeXT-developed format for saving web pages and their dependencies in a bundle that may also be served by a web server.

Chrome offers the "webpage, complete" format which saves the page with a folder containing the required resources.

== See also ==
- Web archiving – the general process of archiving web pages
- List of web archiving file formats – file formats for archiving web pages
