= NPAPI =

Application programming interface

Netscape Plugin Application Programming Interface (NPAPI) is a deprecated application programming interface (API) for web browser plugins, initially developed for Netscape Navigator 2.0 in 1995 and subsequently adopted by other browsers.

In the NPAPI architecture, a plugin declares content types (e.g. "audio/mp3") that it can handle. When the browser encounters a content type it cannot handle natively, it loads the appropriate plugin, sets aside space within the browser context for the plugin to render and then streams data to it. The plugin is responsible for rendering the data. The plugin runs in-place within the page, as opposed to older browsers that had to launch an external application to handle unknown content types. NPAPI requires each plugin to implement and expose approximately 15 functions for initializing, creating, deleting and positioning plugin content. NPAPI also supports scripting, printing, full-screen plugins, windowless plugins and content streaming.

NPAPI was frequently used for plugins which required intensive, low-level performance such as video players, including Adobe Flash Player and Microsoft Silverlight, as well as platforms for web applications such as the Java Runtime Environment.

NPAPI support among major browsers started to wane since 2015 and it was gradually deprecated over the following 7 years. All major web browsers have removed support for third-party NPAPI plugins for security and maintenance reasons.

== History ==
The origin of the Netscape plugin API started not within Netscape, but at Adobe Systems as described in Mattias Andersson's book PDF Printing and Publishing. Adobe CEO John Warnock and Acrobat developer Allan Padgett had been looking for a way to take PDF beyond the desktop, and Netscape's release of Navigator provided that opportunity. Padgett and fellow engineer Eshwar Priyadarshan reverse-engineered the Netscape browser so that PDF files appeared as native web elements, opening inside Navigator when clicked. Their demo was presented to Warnock and Netscape CEO Jim Clark.

While Clark was eager to add "Allan's Hack" to Navigator, Padgett proposed an alternative: a plugin architecture such that any file type could be treated as a native format. Adobe engineers Gordon Dow and Nabeel Al-Shamma had recently added a plugin architecture to Acrobat to let third parties extend PDF. Clark agreed and Netscape set off to design an API that would support that model.

== Scripting support ==
Scripting is a feature allowing JavaScript code in a web page to interact with the plugin. Various versions of Netscape and then Mozilla supported this feature using different technologies, including LiveConnect, XPConnect, and NPRuntime.

=== LiveConnect ===
LiveConnect is a feature of Web browsers that allows Java and JavaScript software to intercommunicate within a Web page. The first version of LiveConnect was built by an intern graduate student at Carnegie Mellon University (CMU). From the Java side, it allows an applet to invoke the embedded scripts of a page, or to access the built-in JavaScript environment, much as scripts can. Conversely, from the JavaScript side, it allows a script to invoke applet methods or access Java runtime libraries as much as applets can.

LiveConnect was used in Netscape 4 to implement the scriptability of NPAPI plugins.

The Open Java Interface-dependent implementation of LiveConnect was removed from the Mozilla source code tree in late June 2009 as part of the Mozilla 2 cleanup effort. It is no longer needed with the release of a redesigned Java Runtime Environment from Sun Microsystems. However, the old implementation was restored for Gecko 1.9.2, as Apple had yet to port the newer JRE over to Mac OS X.

The Java–JavaScript functionality supported by the redesigned Java Runtime Environment is still called "LiveConnect", despite the Open Java Interface-specific approach having been abandoned. With Netscape 4, NPAPI was extended to allow plugins to be scripted. This extension is called LiveConnect. A plugin could implement a Java class and expose an instance of it. The class could be called from JavaScript and Java applets running within the page.

The disadvantage of LiveConnect is, that it is heavily tied to the version of Java embedded within the Netscape browser. This prevented the browser from using other Java runtimes and added bloat to the browser download size since it required Java to script plugins. Additionally, LiveConnect is tricky to program: The developer has to define a Java class for the plugin, run it through a specialized Java header compiler, and implement native methods. Handling strings, exceptions, and other Java objects from C++ is non-obvious. In addition, LiveConnect uses an earlier and now obsolete application programming interface (API) for invoking native C++ calls from Java, called JRI. The JRI technology has long since been supplanted by JNI.

=== XPConnect ===
XPConnect (Cross Platform Connect) is a technology which enables simple interoperation between XPCOM and JavaScript.

==== Object connection ====
XPConnect allows JavaScript objects to transparently access and manipulate XPCOM objects. It also enables JavaScript objects to present XPCOM compliant interfaces to be called by XPCOM objects. A main goal is that objects communicating from either side of an XPCOM style interface should not generally need to know or care about the implementation language of the object on the other side of the interface.

XPConnect's primary reason for existence is to replace handwritten code used in places where native code needs to interact with JavaScript code. An example is the DOM module.

==== Security ====
Full privileges are only granted by default to chrome scripts, i.e. scripts that are part of the application or of an extension. For remote HTML/XHTML/XUL documents, most XPCOM objects are not accessible by the scripts as they have limited privileges due to security reasons. Even if they are accessible (e.g. the XMLHttpRequest object), the usual security restrictions can also be found (e.g. cannot open URLs of other domains).

Mozilla was already using XPCOM to define the interfaces to many objects implemented in C++. Each interface was defined by an IDL file, and run through an IDL compiler that produced header files and a language-neutral type library that was a binary representation of the interface. This binary described the interface, the methods, the parameters, the data structures and enumerations.

XPConnect uses the type library information to marshal calls between different thread contexts and between JavaScript and natively compiled C++. XPConnect is used extensively throughout Mozilla. Starting with Netscape 6.1 and Mozilla 0.9.2, NPAPI was extended, so that a plugin could return a scriptable interface to itself and XPConnect would marshal calls to it from JavaScript and the C++ implementation.

XPConnect has no Java dependency. However, the technology is based on XPCOM. Thus the plugin developer must be familiar with reference counting, interfaces and IDL to implement scripting. The dependency on XPCOM led to certain dynamic linking issues (e.g. the fragile base class problem) which had to be solved before the plugin would work correctly with different browsers. XPCOM has since been changed to supply a statically linked version to address such issues. This approach also requires an .xpt file to be installed next to the dynamic-link library (DLL); otherwise the plugin appears to work, but the scripting does not, causing confusion.

=== NPRuntime ===
At the end of 2004, all major browser companies using NPAPI agreed on NPRuntime as an extension to the original NPAPI to supply scripting, via an API that is similar in style to the old C-style NPAPI and is independent of other browser technologies like Java or XPCOM. It is only supported by Firefox ESR (Extended Support Release) and Safari.

== Support ==
Because of the age of the API, security issues, and adoption of alternative technologies such as HTML5, many software vendors began to phase out NPAPI support in 2013.

=== Internet Explorer ===
Internet Explorer versions 3 through 5.5 SP2 supported NPAPI, allowing plugins that functioned in Netscape Navigator to function in Internet Explorer. Support came via a small ActiveX control (named "plugin.ocx") that acted as a shim between ActiveX and the NPAPI plugin. Microsoft dropped support in version 5.5 SP2 onwards for security reasons.

=== Google Chrome ===
Google Chrome permanently dropped all NPAPI support from all platforms in September 2015. In September 2013, Google announced that it would phase out NPAPI support in its Google Chrome browser during 2014, stating that "[its] 90s-era architecture has become a leading cause of hangs, crashes, security incidents, and code complexity". In May 2014, NPAPI support was removed from the Linux version of Chrome 35 and later. In April 2015, Chrome for Windows and OS X (versions 42 and later) disabled NPAPI support by default. However, until September 2015 (version 45), users could re-enable NPAPI.

=== Opera ===
Opera dropped support with version 37 in May 2016.

=== Firefox ===
Mozilla Firefox release 52.0 in March 2017 removed all support for NPAPI except for Flash. Meanwhile, the ESR channel retained general support for this feature with version 52 ESR being the last NPAPI resort. Firefox 69.0 disabled the Flash NPAPI by default. In Firefox 85.0, released in January 2021, NPAPI support was completely removed; Gecko Media Plugin (GMP) is recommended for DRM and video codecs. In the ESR channel, support for Flash NPAPI ended with version 78.15.0, released in October 2021.

=== Safari ===
Safari has dropped support for all NPAPI plugins except for Flash with version 12 released in September 2018. Flash support has been removed from Safari 14, released in September 2020.

=== SeaMonkey ===
SeaMonkey stopped supporting NPAPI plugins from version 2.53.1, with the exception of Flash. NPAPI support was completely removed in SeaMonkey 2.53.7, released in March 2021.

=== Support ===
The following list of web browsers support all NPAPI plugins:

- 360 Secure Browser (Chinese: 360安全浏览器) or 360 Extreme Explorer (Chinese: 360极速浏览器)
- Basilisk
- K-Meleon (Goanna engine)
- Pale Moon (Pale Moon future roadmap)
- Uzbl

== Similar technologies ==
=== ActiveX ===
Internet Explorer and browsers based on Internet Explorer use ActiveX controls, ActiveX documents and ActiveX scripting to offer in-page extensibility on par with NPAPI. Although commonly associated with Internet Explorer, ActiveX is integration technology that allows any computer program to integrate parts of other computer programs that support such integration. Internet Explorer, however, is discontinued and its replacement, Microsoft Edge, does not support ActiveX.

=== PPAPI ===
On 12 August 2009 a page on Google Code introduced a new project called Pepper, with the associated Pepper Plugin API (PPAPI); PPAPI is a derivative of NPAPI aimed to make plugins more portable and more secure. This extension is designed specifically to ease the implementation of out-of-process plugin execution.

PPAPI was initially only supported by Google Chrome and Chromium. Later, other Chromium-based browsers such as Opera and Vivaldi added PPAPI plugin support.

In February 2012 Adobe Systems announced that future Linux versions of Adobe Flash Player would be provided only via PPAPI. The previous release, Flash Player 11.2, with NPAPI support, would receive security updates for five years. In August 2016 Adobe announced that, contrary to their previous statement, it would again support the NPAPI Flash Player on Linux and keep releasing new versions of it.

In August 2020, Google announced that support for PPAPI would be removed from Google Chrome and Chromium in June 2022.

== See also ==
- Netscape Server Application Programming Interface (NSAPI)
