= Pale Moon =

Free and open-source web browser

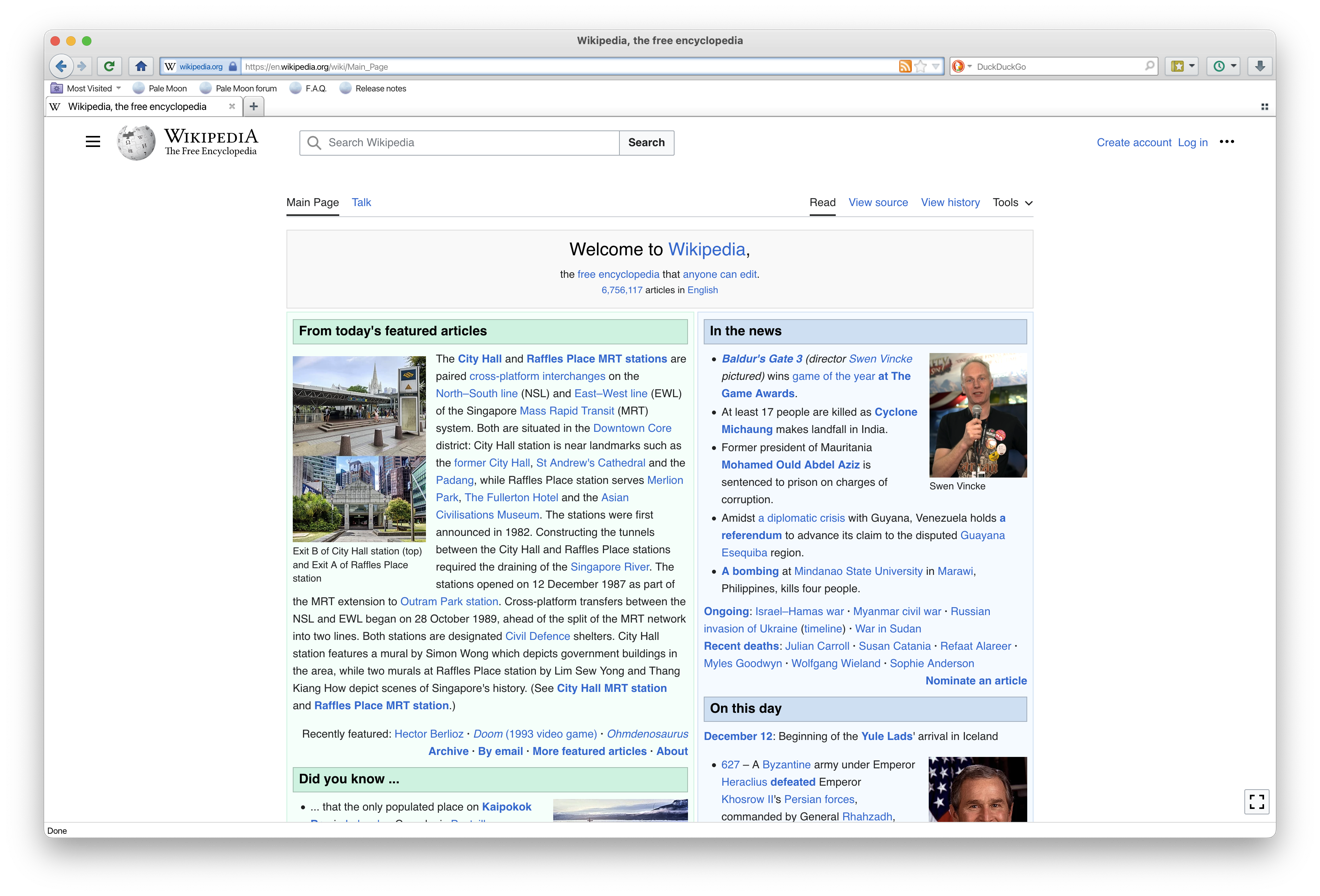
- Pale Moon 32 running on macOS Sonoma
- Developer: Moonchild Productions
- Release: 4 October 2009; 17 years ago
- Stable release: 35.0.2 / 6 October 2026; 14 days ago
- Written in: C, C++, Cascading Style Sheets, JavaScript, XML User Interface Language
- Engines: Goanna, SpiderMonkey
- Operating system: Windows 7 SP1 or later FreeBSD 14.0 or later OS X Lion or later Linux; Contributed builds for various platforms
- Platform: IA-32, x86-64, ARM64
- Available in: 37 languages
- List of languages Arabic (ar), Bulgarian (bg), Traditional Chinese (zh-TW), Simplified Chinese (zh-CN), Croatian (hr), Czech (cs), Danish (da), Dutch (nl), American English (en-US), British English (en-GB), Filipino (tl), Finnish (fi), French (fr), Galician (gl), Greek (el), Hungarian (hu), Indonesian (id), Italian (it), Icelandic (is), Japanese (ja), Korean (ko), Polish (pl), Brazilian Portuguese (pt-BR), European Portuguese (pt-PT), Romanian (ro), Russian (ru) Argentine Spanish (es-AR), Mexican Spanish (es-M), Serbian [cyrillic] (sr), Castilian Spanish (es-ES), Slovak (sk), Slovenian (sl), Swedish (sv-SE), Thai (th), Turkish (tr), Ukrainian (uk)
- Type: Web browser Includes RSS reader
- License: Source code: MPL-2.0; Binaries: Proprietary freeware, or MPL-2.0 if branding is removed
- Website: www.palemoon.org
- Repository: repo.palemoon.org/MoonchildProductions/Pale-Moon

Pale Moon is a free and open-source web browser licensed under the MPL-2.0 with a stated emphasis on customization. There are official releases for Microsoft Windows, FreeBSD, macOS, and Linux.

Pale Moon originated as a fork of Firefox, but has subsequently diverged. The main differences are its user interface, add-on system, and single-process architecture. Pale Moon retains the user interface of Firefox from versions 4 to 28 and supports both legacy Firefox extensions and NPAPI plugins.

== History ==
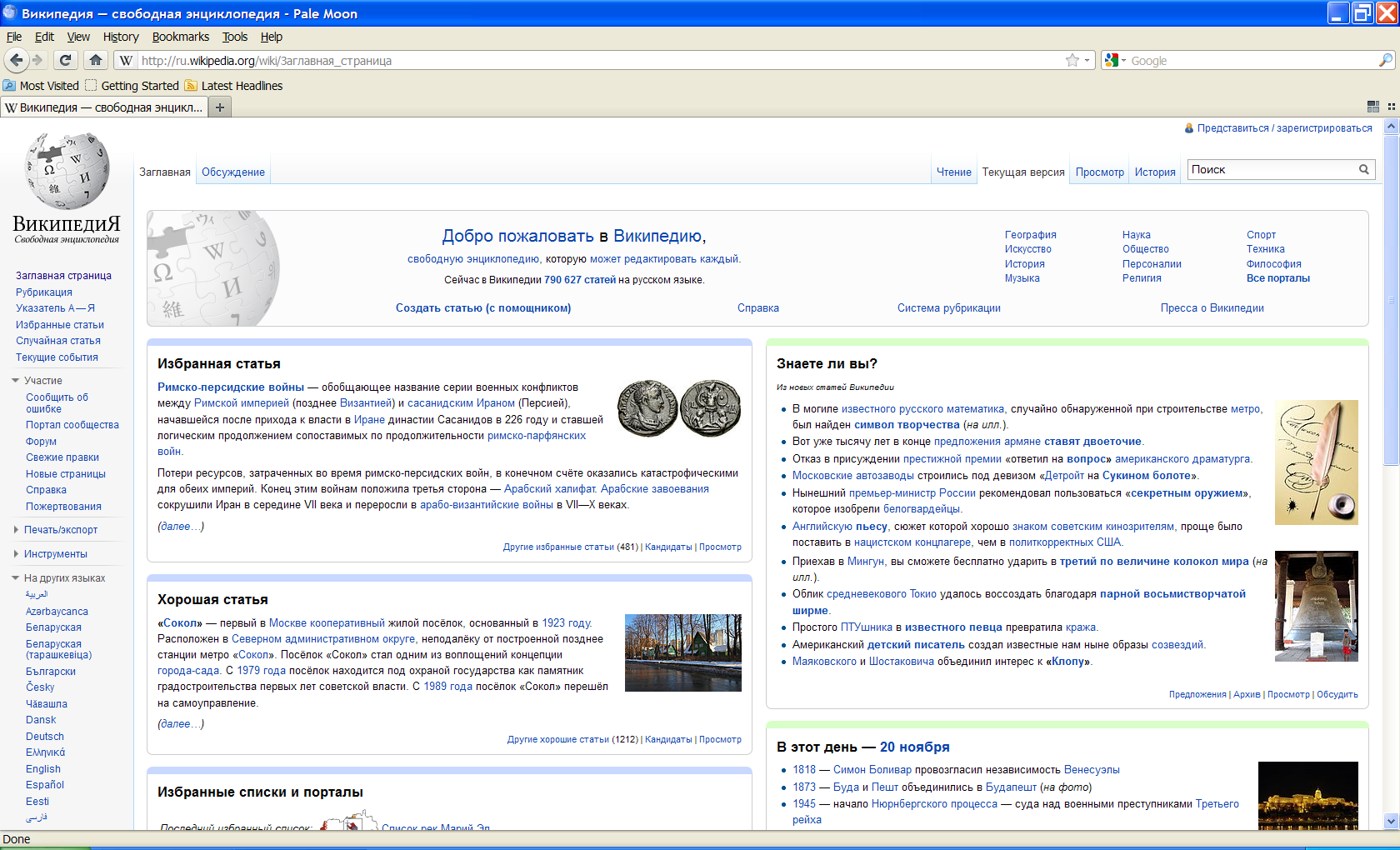
Pale Moon 8

Pale Moon was created by M.C. Straver (alias Moonchild). Straver currently serves as the primary maintainer and lead developer of the browser.

In 2016, starting with version 26, Pale Moon switched to using the Goanna rendering engine, a fork of Gecko. Prior versions of the browser had used Gecko.

In 2017, the Pale Moon team began the Unified XUL Platform (UXP) project due to major upcoming changes in the Mozilla codebase. The Basilisk web browser was developed to serve as a "reference application" for development before Pale Moon switched over to using UXP.

In 2019, hackers breached a Pale Moon archive server and infected the older installers with malware; the latest Pale Moon releases at the time were not affected. The breach took place between April and June, and the affected server was taken down on July 9 when it was discovered.

In 2021, Pale Moon announced that they would stop supporting legacy Firefox extensions that weren't specially ported to the browser, starting with version 29.2.0.

In 2022, a change in direction for Pale Moon was announced to improve website and add-on capability. This resulted in version 30, which used the Firefox GUID to restore compatibility with legacy Firefox extensions, marking the start of increased UXP and Goanna development.

Version 30 was recalled due to what the project called "undesired code changes" and alleged disruptions to the add-ons server preceding the departure of one of the main developers. Version 31 was released shortly after to fix these issues.

== Features ==
Pale Moon's default search engine is DuckDuckGo, and it uses the IP-API service instead of Google for geolocation. The browser is lightweight in its resource usage, in addition to having no telemetry or data collection. However, certain web applications and modern web sites may encounter issues with the browser.

=== Supported features ===
==== Theming ====
Pale Moon's user interface can be customized by downloadable XUL-based themes (called complete themes) that are granted lower-level access to modify every aspect of the browser's user interface. This was a feature present in Firefox before its removal with version 57 in favor of a lightweight theming system. Firefox Personas, an older lightweight theming system, is also supported by Pale Moon.

The default theme included with Pale Moon is the same one that was used by Firefox from versions 4 to 28, known as Strata.

==== Extensions ====
The browser has its own library of extensions, and also continues to support many legacy Firefox add-ons built with XUL and XPCOM, which Firefox dropped support for in 2017 with version 57. Unlike WebExtensions, which are used by most modern browsers, XUL/XPCOM extensions provide a vast amount of control; they have the ability to completely modify the browser and implement non-existent features themselves. NPAPI plugins, such as the deprecated Adobe Flash Player and Microsoft Silverlight, also continue to be supported by Pale Moon.

=== Unsupported features ===
==== WebRTC ====
WebRTC is a real-time communication API for browsers that platforms such as Google Meet, Discord, and WhatsApp rely on for voice and video calls. Unlike most other browsers, Pale Moon does not support WebRTC by design; this is due to the development team's belief that it has "security and privacy flaws", in addition to their position that WebRTC does not belong in a browser and is "best left to dedicated programs or at most a browser plug-in".

==== WebExtensions ====
Chromium and Firefox based browsers, as well as Safari, use implementations of the WebExtension API for their add-on systems. Pale Moon does not support WebExtensions by design, choosing to maintain Firefox's legacy extension model instead; while legacy extensions have more capabilities than WebExtensions, major browsers have used WebExtensions for many years and as such have larger and more up-to-date add-on libraries.

=== Process architecture ===
Pale Moon is built around a single-process architecture, meaning all browser operations are handled by one process, unlike most current browsers which are multi-process. This single-process design was also used by Firefox before it moved to a multi-process architecture with Project Electrolysis (e10s). Pale Moon does not support e10s, which is a deliberate decision on behalf of the development team due to multiple perceived drawbacks of it. While the use of e10s does have major speed and stability benefits, such as ensuring slow webpages do not crash the browser, in addition to providing a greater degree of sandboxing, it also leads to a higher amount of RAM consumption.

== UXP ==
Pale Moon is built upon the Unified XUL Platform (UXP), a cross-platform, multimedia application base that was forked from Mozilla code prior to the introduction of Firefox Quantum.

UXP is a fork of the Firefox 52 ESR platform that was created in 2017 due to XUL/XPCOM support being removed from the Firefox codebase. Moonchild Productions develops UXP independently alongside Pale Moon.

=== Goanna ===
UXP includes the Goanna layout and rendering engine, which is a fork of Mozilla's Gecko engine that Pale Moon switched to in 2015 ostensibly for legal and web compatibility reasons.

== Supported platforms ==
Windows 7 (SP1) and above are supported, along with any modern Linux distribution as long as the processors support AVX (64-bit) or SSE2 (32-bit, Windows) and there is at least 2 GB of RAM.

Mac OS X Lion and above is supported; ARM64 builds of the browser (for Apple silicon) require macOS Big Sur and newer. FreeBSD 14.0 and above are also supported.

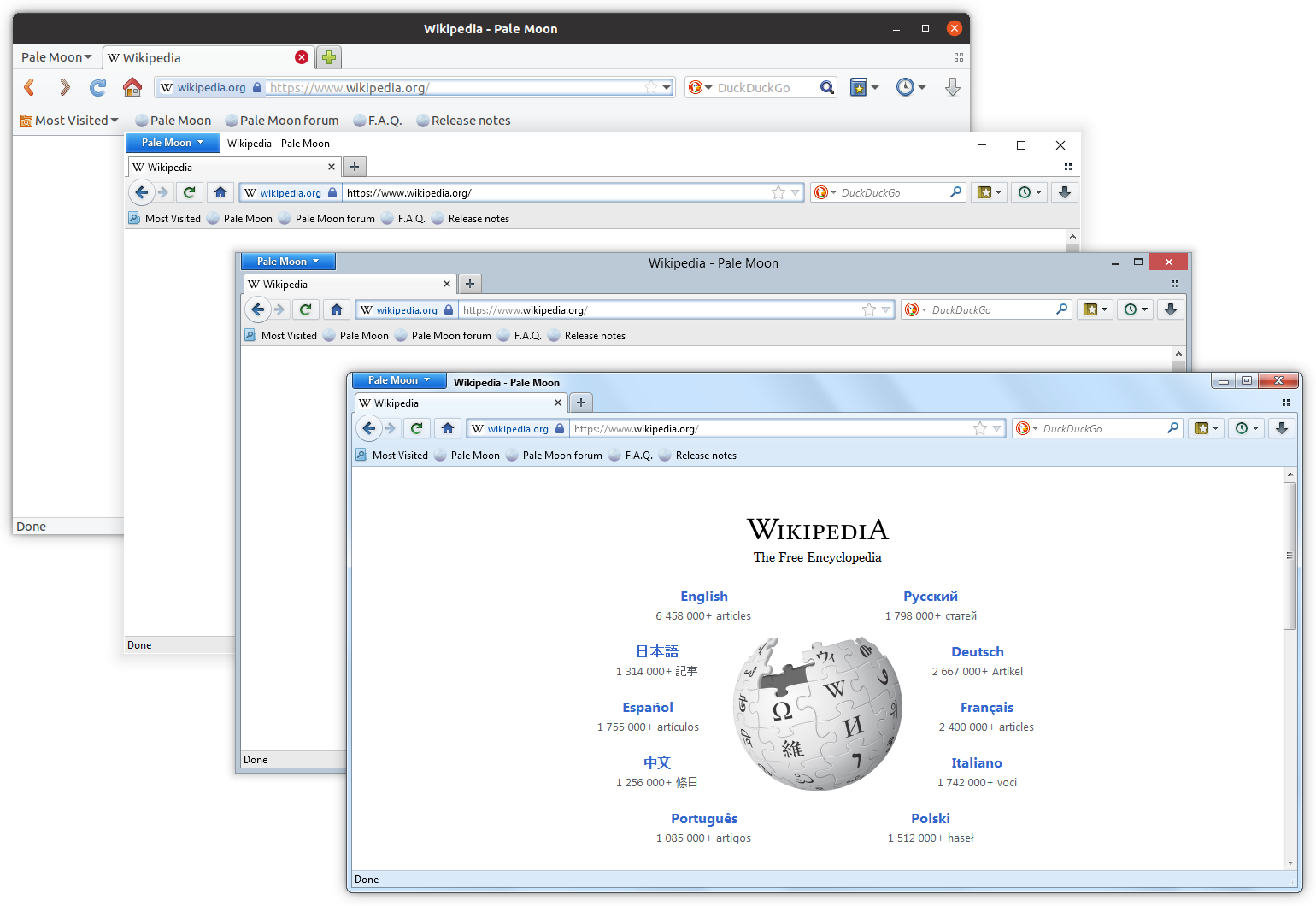
Pale Moon running on Ubuntu Linux, Windows 10, Windows 8.1, and Windows 7

Previously, Windows XP and Vista were supported, but are no longer supported from versions 27 and 28 onwards, respectively.

An Android build was developed in 2014, but was cancelled by the developer due to lack of community involvement a year later.

== Notable forks ==
Mypal was formerly a fork of Pale Moon that supported Windows XP, but after a public dispute allegedly initiated by the creators of Pale Moon, the project was rewritten based on Firefox Quantum. Current versions of Mypal are based on the Firefox 68-78 codebase.

New Moon is a fork of Pale Moon which supports Windows XP.

== See also ==
- Mozilla Firefox
- Basilisk (web browser)
- Gecko (software)
- K-Meleon
