= Browser extension =

Program that extends the functionality of a web browser

A browser extension is a software module for customizing a web browser. Browsers typically allow users to install a variety of extensions, including user interface modifications, cookie management, ad blocking, and custom scripting and styling of web pages.

Browser plug-ins are a different type of module and no longer supported by the major browsers. One difference is that extensions are distributed as source code, while plug-ins are executables (i.e. object code). The most popular browser, Google Chrome, has over 230,000 extensions available but stopped supporting plug-ins in 2020.

== History ==
Internet Explorer was the first major browser to support extensions, with the release of version 4 in 1997. Firefox has supported extensions since its launch in 2004. Opera and Chrome began supporting extensions in 2009, and Safari did so the following year. Microsoft Edge added extension support in 2016.

=== API conformity ===
In 2015, a community group formed under the W3C to create a single standard application programming interface (API) for browser extensions. While this particular work did not reach fruition, every major browser now has the same or very similar API due to the popularity of Google Chrome.

Chrome was the first browser with an extension API based solely on HTML, CSS, and JavaScript. Beta testing for this capability began in 2009, and the following year Google opened the Chrome Web Store. As of June 2012, there were 750 million total installations of extensions and other content hosted on the store. In the same year, Chrome overtook Internet Explorer as the world's most popular browser, and its usage share reached 60% in 2018.

Because of Chrome's success, Microsoft created a very similar extension API for its Edge browser, with the goal of making it easy for Chrome extension developers to port their work to Edge. But after three years, Edge still had a disappointingly small market share, so Microsoft rebuilt it as a Chromium-based browser. (Chromium is Google's open-source project that serves as the functional core of Chrome and many other browsers.) Now that Edge has the same API as Chrome, extensions can be installed directly from the Chrome Web Store.

In 2015, Mozilla announced that the long-standing XUL and XPCOM extension capabilities of Firefox would be replaced with a less-permissive API very similar to Chrome's. This change was enacted in 2017. Firefox extensions are now largely compatible with their Chrome counterparts.

Apple was the last major exception to this trend, but support for extensions conforming to the Chrome API was added to Safari for macOS in 2020. Extensions were later enabled in the iOS version for the first time.

In 2021, these browser vendors formed a new W3C community group, called WebExtensions, to "specify a model, permissions, and a common core of APIs". However, Google joined this during its overhaul of Chrome's extension API, known as Manifest V3, which greatly reduces the capability of ad blockers and privacy-related extensions. Thus the WebExtensions group is viewed by some extension developers as nothing more than Google imposing its Manifest V3 design.

== Unwanted behavior ==
Browser extensions typically have access to sensitive data, such as browsing history, and they have the ability to alter some browser settings, add user interface items, or replace website content. As a result, there have been instances of malware, so users need to be cautious about what extensions they install.

There have also been cases of applications installing browser extensions without the user's knowledge, making it hard for the user to uninstall the unwanted extension.

Some Google Chrome extension developers have sold their extensions to third-parties who then incorporated adware. In 2014, Google removed two such extensions from the Chrome Web Store after many users complained about unwanted pop-up ads. The following year, Google acknowledged that about five percent of visits to its own websites had been altered by extensions with adware.
