= SWI =

SWI may refer to:

== Places ==
- Switzerland (UNDP country code; not the ISO 3166-1 code, which is CHE)
- Swindon railway station (National Rail code SWI), serving Swindon, Wiltshire, United Kingdom
- Sherman Municipal Airport, Texas, United States, with the FAA LID of SWI

== Science and technology ==
- SWI-Prolog, a free implementation of the programming language Prolog
- Susceptibility weighted imaging, in magnetic resonance imaging (MRI) used in medical contexts
- Software interrupt, an interrupt routine in a computer operating system
  - SWI, an assembler mnemonic to perform a software interrupt on the ARM microprocessor family
- Standard Work Instruction, codification of standard work in manufacturing
- Szilagyi Waterspout Index

== Other uses ==
- Swissinfo, a service of the Swiss Broadcasting Corporation
- Structured Word Inquiry, a pedagogical technique involving the scientific investigation of the spelling of words
- Scottish Women's Institutes, a registered charity in Scotland
