= Pronunciation of GIF =

Linguistic dispute

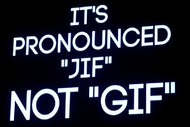
Steve Wilhite's slide at the 2013 Webby Awards

The pronunciation of GIF, an acronym for the Graphics Interchange Format, has been disputed since the 1990s. Popularly rendered in English as a one-syllable word, the acronym is most commonly pronounced GHIF /ɡɪf/ (with a hard g as in gig) or JIF /dʒɪf/ (with a soft g as in gin), differing in the phoneme represented by the letter G. Many public figures and institutions have taken sides in the debate; Steve Wilhite, the computer scientist who created the Graphics Interchange Format, gave a speech at the 2013 Webby Awards arguing for the soft-g pronunciation. Others have pointed to the term's origin from abbreviation of the hard-g word graphics to argue for the other pronunciation. Some speakers pronounce GIF as an initialism rather than an acronym, producing /dʒiː aɪ ɛf/.

The controversy stems partly from the fact that the pronunciation of an initial g is not standardized; the hard g prevails in words such as gift, while the soft g is used in others such as ginger. Linguistic analyses show no clear advantage for either phoneme based on the pronunciation frequencies of similar English words, and English dictionaries generally accept both main alternatives as valid. The pronunciation of the acronym can also vary in other languages.

== Background ==
The Graphics Interchange Format (GIF) is an image file format developed in 1987 by Steve Wilhite at the American online service provider CompuServe. GIFs are popularly used to display short, looped animations. The acronym GIF, commonly pronounced as a monosyllable, has a disputed pronunciation. Some individuals pronounce the word with a hard g, as in /ɡɪf/, whereas others pronounce it with a soft g, as in /dʒɪf/. A minority prefer to pronounce it as an initialism, speaking the name of each letter, creating the pronunciation /dʒiː aɪ ɛf/.

Wilhite and the team who developed the file format included in the technical specifications that the acronym was to be pronounced with a soft g. In the specifications, the team wrote that "choosy programmers choose ... 'jif'", in homage to the peanut butter company Jif's advertising slogan of "choosy moms choose Jif". According to ABC News, the debate stretches as far back as 1994, with an author of an encyclopedia of image formats stating that "most people" seem to prefer the hard g pronunciation over his preferred soft g.

=== Other languages ===
In French, the acronym tends to be pronounced [ʒif], with the voiced postalveolar fricative, [ʒ], as in the j in the French joie or the s in the English measure or vision, even though [dʒ], which does not occur in native vocabulary, tends to be retained in English loanwords (such as jeans). In Norwegian, GIF is pronounced with a hard g, [ɡ], unlike native words, for which the sequence ⟨gi⟩ would be pronounced with a voiced palatal approximant, [j], like the y in English yes. In German, there is no soft g, so the pronunciation is [ɡɪf].

== Analysis ==
=== Cause ===
In English, the linguistic controversy stems partly from the fact that there is no standard for how the letter sequence gi is to be pronounced; the hard g prevails in words such as gift, while the soft g is used in others, such as ginger, giraffe and gist. In Old English, g could represent: 1) the voiced palatal approximant /j/ (as in Modern English ⟨yes⟩), which had the allophone [d͡ʒ]—the voiced postalveolar affricate (as in Modern English ⟨jab⟩), and 2) the voiced velar fricative /ɣ/ (not present in Modern English), which had the allophone [ɡ]—the voiced velar plosive (as in Modern English ⟨gap⟩). Most [j]-retaining words of Old English origin are spelt now with ⟨y⟩ (such as ⟨yes⟩ and ⟨yet⟩). Modern grammars of Old English distinguish between: 1) the palatal value [j] and the postalveolar value [d͡ʒ] by writing ⟨ġ⟩ and 2) the velar values [ɣ] and [ɡ] by writing ⟨g⟩.

An analysis of 269 words by linguist Michael Dow found near-tied results on whether a hard or soft g was more appropriate based on other English words; the results varied somewhat depending on what parameters were used. Of the 105 words that contained gi somewhere in the word, 68 used the soft g while only 37 employed its counterpart. However, the hard g words were found to be significantly more common in everyday English; comparatively obscure words like flibbertigibbet and tergiversate, both pronounced with a soft g, were included in the list of 68 soft gi words. When the prevalence of each word was taken into account, it was found that the hard and soft g appeared in nearly equal frequencies in gi words. No clear favorite was found by only using the words that begin with gi, nor by only using words with one syllable such as gift and gin.

In her coverage of Dow's piece, Canadian linguist Gretchen McCulloch theorizes that since the hard and soft g in this context are used with near-equal frequency, when a person first encounters the word GIF, they make a guess akin to flipping a coin by comparing it to other words they have encountered in the past. Once they have a favorite one way or the other, the notion is solidified—leading McCulloch to comment that this "probably means we'll be fighting the gif pronunciation war for generations to come".

=== Arguments ===
A 2019 analysis by linguist Marten van der Meulen found that the most common arguments employed online over the pronunciation of GIF are "system" arguments, which support one side of the debate by contending that the pronunciation should flow from a consistent rule of language. One example of this would be the "system acronym" argument: the idea that because the letter g in GIF stands for the word graphics, it ought to be pronounced in the acronym with the same phoneme as in the word, i.e. with a hard g. This particular argument is sometimes accompanied by the quip that if the acronym were to be pronounced with a soft g, the word should be pronounced likewise, as /ˈdʒræfɪks/ ("jraphics"). A rebuttal to this argument is that acronyms are not required to follow the pronunciations of their root words. For example, the letter u in the word scuba /ˈskuːbə/ —an acronym for self-contained underwater breathing apparatus—is pronounced /uː/ even though its deriving word, underwater, is pronounced instead with /ʌ/. A similar acronym discrepancy arises with NASA (National Aeronautics and Space Administration, pronounced /ˈnæsə/).

Another example of a "system" argument is frequency analysis, which examines how many other English words employ hard or soft g pronunciations in other situations, similar to Dow's analysis. After Steve Wilhite announced his opinion that the soft g pronunciation was the only correct form, there was significant chatter on social media and in the press on both sides of the issue. An article by Casey Chan, writing for Gizmodo, argued that Wilhite was wrong because soft g words followed by if should be spelled with the letter j, such as the "jiffy" in "Jiffy Lube" and "be back in a jiffy", as well as the peanut butter company Jif.

The next most common argument found in van der Meulen's analysis was an argument that cited an authority, usually Wilhite, as the creator of the file format. After Wilhite announced his support for the soft g pronunciation, many recognized him as the authority on the pronunciation of the word due to his creation of its format. Wilhite is the most commonly cited authority for the pronunciation of GIF; 65.2 percent of surveyed arguments citing an authority favored a soft g. Some, including Casey Chan, cited U.S. President Barack Obama in supporting the hard g; others cited various dictionaries, or software assistants such as Siri as authorities for GIF's pronunciation.

=== Polling ===
The number of users who supported each variant of the word's pronunciation in van der Meulen's analysis
1. Hard g (57.2%)
2. Soft g (31.8%)
3. Both (favoring soft g) (8.20%)
4. Pronounce each letter (2.80%)

A 2013 online poll of 30,706 people worldwide by Mashable, Addvocate, and Column Five found that seven in ten preferred the hard g over the soft g.

Van der Meulen's analysis found that 57.2 percent of users who offered an opinion supported the hard g, while 31.8 percent favored the soft g. The analysis also found that 8.2 percent of users support both pronunciations, while favoring the soft g, and 2.8 percent favored enunciating each letter.

An informal poll of developers on Stack Overflow showed that 65.6 percent of respondents favored the hard g pronunciation, while 26.3 percent used the soft g, 6 percent sounded out every letter, and 2 percent employed a different pronunciation altogether. However, an analysis from The Economist argued that the disparities in the results were exaggerated by sampling bias; the article commented that while the countries where the hard g is used make up 45 percent of the world's population, respondents from those countries comprised 79 percent of the sample. When the populations of each country were adjusted for, the analysis found that hard g still led, albeit by a narrower margin of 44 percent to 32 percent for soft g. In addition, this adjustment brought the popularity of pronouncing each letter up to 21 percent; this variation is common in Asian countries, where it is employed by half of Chinese respondents and 70 percent of South Korean respondents. Developed countries as a whole tended to favor the hard g pronunciation.

=== Dictionaries ===
Different dictionaries disagree on the inclusion and ordering of different pronunciations.

Dictionary	Edition	Language	First pronunciation	Second pronunciation	Citation
Cambridge Dictionary	Online	American English	/ɡɪf/	/dʒɪf/	
Cambridge Dictionary	Online	British English	/ɡɪf/	/dʒɪf/	
Collins English Dictionary	Twelfth Edition 2014	English	/ɡɪf/	—	
Dictionary.com	Online	English	/dʒɪf/	/ɡɪf/	
Lexico	Online	English	/ɡɪf/	—	
Merriam-Webster	Online	English	/ɡɪf/	/dʒɪf/	
New Oxford American Dictionary	Second Edition 2005	American English	/dʒɪf/	—	
Oxford Dictionary of English	Third Edition 2010	English	/dʒɪf/	/ɡɪf/	
The American Heritage Dictionary of the English Language	Fifth Edition 2016	American English	/ɡɪf/	/dʒɪf/	
Petit Robert	Online	French	[ʒif]	—	
Petit Larousse	Online	French	[ʒif]	—	
Det Norske Akademis ordbok	Online	Norwegian	[gifː]	—	

== Incidents ==
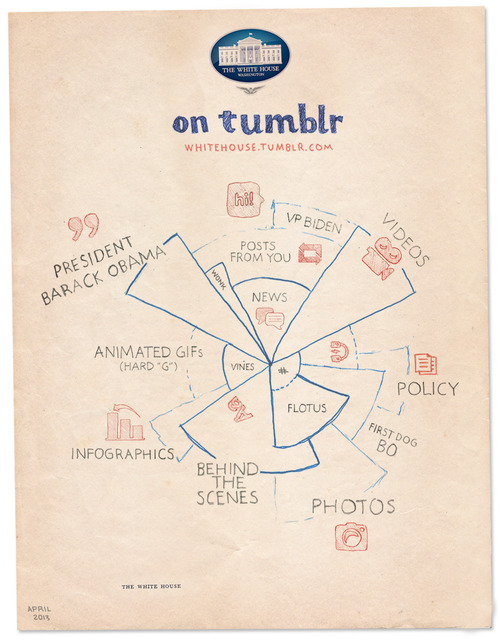
The White House's account on Tumblr posted a humorous infographic in 2013 indicating that GIF was to be pronounced with a hard g.

In May 2013, Wilhite was presented with a lifetime achievement award at the annual Webby Awards honoring excellence on the Internet. Upon accepting the award at the ceremony, Wilhite displayed a five-word slide that simply read, in all caps: "It's pronounced 'jif' not 'gif'". Here, jif refers to the soft g pronunciation. Following the speech, Wilhite told The New York Times: "The Oxford English Dictionary accepts both pronunciations. They are wrong. It is a soft g ... End of story."

The audience attending the ceremony reacted positively to the short speech, but it generated controversy online, with some commentators pushing back against Wilhite's pronunciation. Van der Meulen remarked that this "seems to be the first ever coiner of a word (or acronym, to be more specific) who gave usage advice about his own creation". More than 17,000 tweets were made in the aftermath of the speech, making "GIF" a trending topic, and more than 50 news articles were written on the incident. The Columbia Journalism Review remarked three years later that the debate seemed to peak with this incident. The peanut butter company Jif responded to a tweet asking how they were feeling following the speech, commenting, "We're nuts about him today." Seven years later, Jif performed a publicity stunt with GIF-hosting platform Giphy. The two companies released a joint statement, arguing that the correct pronunciation employs a hard g and releasing limited-time jars of peanut butter labeled "GIF" instead of "JIF".

In October 2013, The New York Times faced some light criticism on social media for an article written by Sarah Lyall that began with the words, "A GIF, pronounced jif, is a compressed image file format invented in 1987." The article included a link to an earlier article from the newspaper, covering Wilhite's speech and the quote he gave them. In December 2013, Alex Trebek, the host of game show Jeopardy!, attracted media attention when the final clue of the episode referenced Wilhite's presentation and opinion on the pronunciation. Trebek read out the responses of contestants using a soft g when the word "GIF" appeared in the correct responses of all three contestants. In the past, Trebek had pronounced each letter individually, to remain neutral.

In June 2014, Barack Obama, then President of the United States, opined that the acronym should be pronounced with a hard g when prompted in a conversation with David Karp, the founder of Tumblr. Miles Klee of The Daily Dot highlighted an April 2013 post on the White House's Tumblr blog, which included a humorous infographic with the text "animated GIFs (hard 'g')".

== See also ==
- English usage controversies
- Hard and soft g
- JPEG Interchange Format, a different image format that uses the acronym JIF
- Linguistic prescription
