= Yamazumi chart =

Stacked bar chart visualization

The Yamazumi chart, or operator balance chart, is a lean manufacturing visual analysis tool used to balance workloads across production lines. Originating from the Japanese term for "stacking", it breaks down total work content into discrete work elements stacked into vertical bars for each operator or workstation. By comparing these stacked bars against a horizontal line representing takt time, teams can identify bottlenecks, eliminate waiting, and establish standardized work. It was originally developed by Toyota.

This is an example of a yamazumi for an assembly area. Colors represent work areas across a unit. Station three is over takt time, revealing a bottleneck. Station 4 is underutilized.

To create a yamazumi, you first must conduct a time observation study:

1. Write down each work element or step of a job
2. Capture ten times for each work element
3. Use the lowest repeatable time for the number in your yamazumi chart.

Use lowest repeatable time instead of an average because an abnormal cycle caused by a defect or missing part can incorrectly skew the time. Don't use the shortest time because the operator may have gotten lucky once and will not be able to reliably repeat the time. If a time does not repeat, use the second lowest time.

On the yamazumi, it can be useful to color code work elements to match the work area. This way you can see how an operator moves across the unit at a glance, revealing poor work flow.

Highlight work elements that cannot easily be moved. These are "rocks" as opposed to "pebbles" that can freely be moved from station to station. Rocks include stations with heavy equipment.

A yamazumi is a powerful device for building a shared understanding of an operation. Anyone can see precisely how the line is performing, as well as where capacity and bottlenecks exist. Teams can quickly identify kaizen opportunities to eliminate bottlenecks or reduce the number of operators required. Managers should never terminate operators freed up through kaizen.

If you add all of the cycle times across every work element and divide takt time into the sum, it calculates a theoretical number of operators required to do the work across the line or cell. This can be a powerful tool to challenge teams with kaizen.
