= CBterm =

Computer emulation software

CBterm/C64
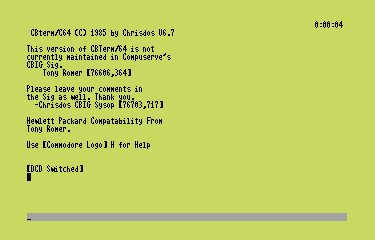
- Original author: Christopher Dunn
- Initial release: 1985
- Stable release: 6.7
- Written in: Assembly language
- Available in: English
- Type: Terminal emulator
- License: Freeware

CBterm/C64, commonly referred to as CBterm, is a terminal emulator for the Commodore 64, authored by Christopher "Chrisdos" Dunn.

CBterm bears a copyright date of 1985; version 5.0 of the software was released in early 1987 and is coded entirely in assembly language. It features 40- and 80-column displays, XMODEM file transfers, ASCII/PETSCII conversion, direct display of RLE graphics, and support for a variety of autodialling modems. Support for the Punter protocol and VIDTEX and VT52 terminal emulation is possible by means of overlays. The software is freely redistributable for non-commercial use.

CBterm 5.0 was favourably reviewed in Run, with columnist Loren Lovhaug praising its speed, customizability, and CompuServe compatibility. Some criticism was levied at the lack of native support for Punter and for baud rates other than 300 and 1200.
