= Steve Wilhite =

American computer scientist (1948–2022)

- Born: Stephen Earl Wilhite; March 3, 1948; West Chester Township, Ohio, U.S.
- Died: March 14, 2022 (aged 74); Cincinnati, Ohio, U.S.
- Education: Ohio State University
- Known for: GIF
- Awards: Webby Lifetime Achievement
- Scientific career
- Fields: Computer science
- Workplaces: CompuServe, AOL

Stephen Earl Wilhite (March 3, 1948 – March 14, 2022) was an American computer scientist who worked at CompuServe and was the engineering lead on the team that created the GIF image file format in 1987. GIF went on to become the de facto standard for 8-bit color images on the Internet until PNG (1996) became a widely supported alternative. The format later became the subject of a patent assertion by Unisys on its use of the LZW compression algorithm. Known as the inventor or creator of the GIF, Wilhite received a Webby Lifetime Achievement Award in 2013.

== Biography ==
Stephen Earl Wilhite was born in West Chester Township, Ohio, on March 3, 1948, the son of Anna Lou (Dorsey), a nurse, and Clarence Earl Wilhite, a factory worker. Wilhite's team at CompuServe developed the GIF (Graphic Interchange Format) in 1987. Its adoption by the earliest web browser in 1991 helped make it a few years later in 1995 the most popular image file format. Twenty years later in 2016, the format still had mainstream use in website design, social media posts, workflow documents and how-to guides.

Wilhite remained a CompuServe/AOL employee into the first decade of the 21st century, working on a variety of CompuServe systems. These included CompuServe's wire protocols, such as Host Micro Interface (HMI) and CompuServe B protocol for the CompuServe Information Manager (CIM); new service features in the early 1990s; Web chat software in the late 1990s; and investigating Web community models until his 2001 departure after suffering a stroke.

Wilhite's name comes up frequently in debate over the pronunciation of the GIF acronym. "The Oxford English Dictionary accepts both pronunciations," Wilhite said. "They are wrong. It is a soft 'G', pronounced 'jif'. End of story." The intended pronunciation deliberately echoes the American peanut butter brand Jif.

Wilhite died at a hospital in Cincinnati, Ohio, following complications from COVID-19, on March 14, 2022, aged 74.
