= Silent e =

Common occurrence of "e" as a silent letter in English, like in "like"

In English orthography, many words feature a silent ⟨e⟩ (single, final, non-syllabic, magic "e"), most commonly at the end of a word or morpheme. Typically it represents a vowel sound that was formerly pronounced, but became silent in late Middle English or Early Modern English.

In a large class of words, as a consequence of a series of historical sound changes, including the Great Vowel Shift, the presence of a suffix on the end of a word influenced the development of the preceding vowel, and in a smaller number of cases it affected the pronunciation of a preceding consonant. When the inflection disappeared in speech, but remained as a historical remnant in the spelling, this silent ⟨e⟩ was reinterpreted synchronically as a marker of the surviving sounds.

This can be seen in the vowels in word-pairs such as rid /rɪd/ and ride /raɪd/, in which the presence of the final, unpronounced ⟨e⟩ appears to alter the sound of the preceding ⟨i⟩. An example with consonants is the word-pair loath (loʊθ) and loathe (loʊð), where the ⟨e⟩ can be understood as a marker of a voiced ⟨th⟩.

As a result of this reinterpretation, the ⟨e⟩ was added by analogy in Early Modern English to many words which had never had a pronounced ⟨e⟩-inflection, and it is used in modern neologisms such as bike, in which there is no historical reason for the presence of the ⟨e⟩, because of a perceived synchronic need to mark the pronunciation of the preceding vowel.

Although Modern English orthography is not entirely consistent here, the correlation is common enough to allow a rule-of-thumb to be used to explain the spelling, especially in phonics education, where a silent ⟨e⟩ which has this effect is sometimes called a magic, sneaky, or bossy ⟨e⟩. Orthographic linguist Gina Cooke uses the term replaceable ⟨e⟩ since replaceability is the consistent mark of the single final non-syllabic ⟨e⟩, and its "silence" differs from other "silent" letters' functions. Some practitioners of Structured Word Inquiry have adopted that terminology.

== Effect on vowels ==
Depending on dialect, English has anywhere from 13 to more than 20 distinct vowel phonemes, both monophthongs and diphthongs. A silent ⟨e⟩, in association with the Latin alphabet's five vowel characters, is one of the ways by which some of these vowel sounds are represented in English orthography.

A silent ⟨e⟩ in association with the other vowels may convert a short vowel sound to a long vowel equivalent, though that may not always be the case. The short vowels are /æ ɛ ɪ ɒ ʌ/ while the equivalent long vowels are /eɪ iː aɪ oʊ juː/. However, because of the complications of the Great Vowel Shift, the long vowel is not always simply a lengthened version of the corresponding short one; and in most cases (for example with ride) is in fact a diphthong (/raɪd/).

To create a long vowel, there is usually only one consonant between the silent ⟨e⟩ and the preceding vowel. In some cases two consonants may also have the same effect, as in table, paste and bathe, while in other cases no consonants are found, as in tie, toe and due. The presence of a double consonant may indicate that the ⟨e⟩ is not silent and does not affect the preceding vowel (as in Jesse and posse).

Modern spelling	Short vowel Without silent ⟨e⟩	Long vowel With silent ⟨e⟩	IPA transcription
slat, slate	slăt	slātɇ	/slæt/ → /sleɪt/
met, mete	mĕt	mētɇ	/mɛt/ → /miːt/
grip, gripe	grĭp	grīpɇ	/ɡrɪp/ → /ɡraɪp/
cod, code	cŏd	cōdɇ	/kɒd/ → /koʊd/
cut, cute	cŭt	cūtɇ	/kʌt/ → /kjuːt/

In English, the name of a vowel is its long vowel form (except in the case of ⟨y⟩, which has the same pronunciation as ⟨i⟩ – compare byte/bite).

This terminology reflects the historical pronunciation and development of those vowels, but as a phonetic description of their current values it may no longer be accurate. The English values of the letters ⟨a, e, i, o, u⟩ used to be similar to the values those letters had in Spanish, French or Italian, namely [a], [e], [i], [o], [u]. The Great Vowel Shift leading to Early Modern English gave current English "long vowels" values that differ markedly from the "short vowels" that they relate to in writing. Since English has a literary tradition that goes back into the Middle English period, written English continues to use Middle English writing conventions to mark distinctions that had been reordered by the chain shift of the long vowels. However, the pronunciation of ⟨u⟩ before silent ⟨e⟩, found mainly in borrowings from French and Latin, is a consequence not of the Great Vowel Shift but of a different series of changes.

When final ⟨e⟩ is not silent, this may be indicated in various ways in English spelling. When representing /iː/, this is usually done via doubling (refugee, employee, with employe as an obsolete spelling). Non-silent ⟨e⟩ can also be indicated by a diacritical mark, such as a grave accent (learnèd) or a diaeresis (learnëd, Brontë). Other diacritical marks are preserved in loanwords (résumé, café, blasé), or introduced on this pattern (maté), though these diacritics are frequently omitted. Other words have no indication that the ⟨e⟩ is not silent (pace, Latin loanword meaning "with due respect to").

=== The ⟨a⟩ group ===
The sounds of the ⟨a⟩ group are some of the more dialectically complex features of contemporary modern English; the phonemes represented in modern "short" ⟨a⟩ include /æ/, /ɑː/, and /ɔː/. See broad A and cot–caught merger for some of the cross-dialect complexities of the English ⟨a⟩ group. A silent ⟨e⟩ typically moves ⟨a⟩ to /eɪ/.

=== The ⟨e⟩ group ===
Silent ⟨e⟩ typically moves ⟨e⟩ to /iː/. This change is generally consistent across nearly all English dialects today, though previously many dialects used /eː/ instead before migrating to /iː/. Some parts of Mid-Ulster English still use /eː/.

=== The ⟨i⟩ group ===
For the "long vowel" represented in written English by ⟨i⟩, the effect of silent ⟨e⟩ is to turn it into a diphthong /aɪ/. If ⟨i⟩ precedes a word final ⟨que⟩ – which usually occurs in words of French origin (unique, pique) – or the rarer ⟨gue⟩ (fatigue, intrigue) the silent ⟨e⟩ appears to turn ⟨i⟩ into /iː/.

=== The ⟨o⟩ group ===
Short ⟨o⟩ often falls in with short ⟨a⟩ and shares some of the complexities of that group. Variously, the written short ⟨o⟩ can represent /ɒ/, /ʌ/, and /ɔː/. The usual effect of silent ⟨e⟩ on written ⟨o⟩ is to fix it as a long /oʊ/ sound.

=== The ⟨u⟩ group ===
Short ⟨u⟩ can variably represent either /ʌ/ or /ʊ/, as a result of the foot–strut split. Silent ⟨e⟩ generally turns ⟨u⟩ to its corresponding long version /juː/, which developed from Middle English /ɪu/. Variably by dialect and even word, the /j/ in this /juː/ may drop (rune /ˈruːn/, lute /ˈluːt/), causing a merger with /uː/; in other cases, the /j/ coalesces with the preceding consonant (issue /ˈɪs.juː/ → /ˈɪʃuː/), meaning that the silent ⟨e⟩ can affect the quality of a consonant much earlier in the word (fissure /ˈfɪʃ.ə(r)/, nature /ˈneɪtʃər/).

== Effect on consonants ==
In addition to indicating that a preceding vowel is a long vowel, a silent ⟨e⟩ when it immediately follows a ⟨c⟩ or ⟨g⟩ also indicates that the ⟨c⟩ is a soft ⟨c⟩ and the ⟨g⟩ is a soft ⟨g⟩. For example:

- Măc > mācɇ (/ˈmæk/ → /ˈmeɪs/)
- stăg > stāgɇ (/ˈstæɡ/ → /ˈsteɪdʒ/)

where /s/ is the expected outcome of the ⟨ce⟩ digraph, and the ⟨ge⟩ in stage is pronounced /dʒ/. The same effect on ⟨c⟩ and ⟨g⟩, but not the preceding vowel, arises in words such as "chance" and "forge". To stop this softening effect, a silent ⟨u⟩ is added before ⟨e⟩, as in "plague" and "fugue".

Silent ⟨e⟩ is used in some words with ⟨dg⟩ in which it does not lengthen a vowel: rĭdgɇ, slĕdgɇ, hŏdgɇ-pŏdgɇ. Spelling such words with ⟨j⟩, the other letter that indicates that sound, does not occur in native or nativized English words.

The same softening effect (⟨c⟩ /k/ → /s/ and ⟨g⟩ /ɡ/ → /dʒ/) also arises with a following (i) or (y).

In word-final position, a similar softening effect can occur with the digraph ⟨th⟩ /θ/ → /ð/; often the form with the ⟨e⟩ is a verb related to the noun form without the e:

- bath, bathe (/bæθ/, /beɪð/)
- breath, breathe (/bɹɛθ/, /bɹið/)
- cloth, clothe (/klɔθ/, /kloʊð/)

== Truly silent ⟨e⟩ ==
In some common words that historically had long vowels, silent ⟨e⟩ no longer has its usual lengthening effect. For example, the ⟨o⟩ in come (as compared to in cone) and in done (as compared to in dome). This is especially common in some words that historically had ⟨f⟩ instead of ⟨v⟩, such as give and love; in Old English, /f/ became /v/ when it appeared between two vowels (OE giefan, lufu), while a geminated ⟨ff⟩ lost its doubling to yield /f/ in that position. This also applies to a large class of words with the adjective suffix -ive, such as captive (where, again, the ⟨i⟩ is not lengthened, unlike in hive), that originally had -if in French.

Some loanwords from French (promenade) retained their French silent ⟨e⟩, called e muet or e caduc, which has no effect on the preceding vowel. Also, the feminine forms of some words of French origin end in a silent ⟨e⟩, for example fiancée, petite and née.

Some English words vary their accented syllable based on whether they are used as nouns or as adjectives. In a few words such as minute, this may affect the operation of silent ⟨e⟩: as an adjective, minúte (/maɪˈnjuːt/, "small") has the usual value of ⟨u⟩ followed by silent ⟨e⟩, while in the noun mínute (/ˈmɪnɪt/, the unit of time), silent ⟨e⟩ does not operate. See initial-stress-derived noun for similar patterns that may give rise to exceptions.

Historically, following the French usage, it was the practice to add a silent ⟨e⟩ at the end of words for aesthetic purposes. For example, words ending in -le (as in subtle and table) as well as following an ⟨s⟩ (such as house and tense, etc) have a redundant silent ⟨e⟩. In the past, the silent ⟨e⟩ was also added to many nouns for similar stylistic reasons, such as poste, teste, etc.

== Dropping of silent ⟨e⟩ ==
A silent ⟨e⟩ is usually dropped when a suffix beginning with a vowel is added to a word, for example: cope to coping, trade to tradable, tense to tension, captive to captivate, plague to plaguing, secure to security, create to creator, etc. However, this is inconsistently applied, as in the case of liveable. In the case of the "-ment" suffix, there is also a divergence of practice. In American English, judge usually becomes judgment, while in British English the e is usually retained, as in judgement.

The silent ⟨e⟩ is usually kept when it is preceded by a ⟨c⟩ or ⟨g⟩ and the suffix does not start with ⟨e⟩, ⟨i⟩, or ⟨y⟩ to keep its softening effect (i.e. change to changeable, outrage to outrageous, etc.).

A silent ⟨e⟩ is not usually dropped in compound words, such as comeback.

== History ==
Silent ⟨e⟩, like many conventions of written language that no longer reflect current pronunciations, was not always silent. In Chaucer's Balade, the first line does not scan properly unless what appears to current eyes to be a silent ⟨e⟩ is pronounced:

Hyd, Absolon, thy giltè tresses clerè

Gilte ends in the same sound as modern English Malta. In Middle English, this final schwa had some grammatical significance, although that was mostly lost by Chaucer's time. It was elided regularly when a word beginning with a vowel came next. The consequences of silent ⟨e⟩ in contemporary spelling reflect the phonology of Middle English. In Middle English, as a consequence of the lax vowel rule shared by most Germanic languages, vowels were long when they historically occurred in stressed open syllables; they were short when they occurred in "checked" or closed syllables. Thus bide /ˈbiːdə/ had a long vowel, while bid /bid/ had a short one.

The historical sequence went something like this:

- In Old English, a phonological distinction was made between long and short vowels.
- In Middle English, vowel length was lost as a phonological feature, but was still phonetically present. A word like bide, syllabified bi.de and phonetically pronounced [biːdə], had one stressed, open, long syllable. On the other hand, the word bid, although stressed, had a short vowel: [bid].
- At some unknown point, the phonetically long vowels began to diphthongize. This was the start of the Great Vowel Shift. Possibly at the same time, the short vowels became lax. So as "bide" [biːdə] became [bɨidə], "bid" [bid] changed to [bɪd].
- At a later point, all word-final schwas were lost. The phonetic motivation for lengthening the vowel—the open syllable—was lost, but the process of diphthongization had already begun, and the vowels which had once been identical except for length were now phonetically dissimilar and phonologically distinct.

The writing convention of silent ⟨e⟩ indicates that different vowel qualities had become phonemic, and were preserved even when phonemic vowel length was lost.

Long vowels could arise by other mechanisms. One of these is known as "compensatory lengthening"; this occurred when consonants formerly present were lost: maid is the modern descendant of Old English mægde. In this example, the g actually became a glide /j/, so in a sense, the length of the consonant stayed where it always had been, and there was no "compensation". The silent ⟨e⟩ rule became available to represent long vowels in writing that arose from other sources; Old English brŷd, representing *bruʒd-i-, became Modern English bride.

The rules of current English spelling were first set forth by Richard Mulcaster in his 1582 publication Elementarie. Mulcaster called silent ⟨e⟩ "qualifying ⟨e⟩", and wrote of it:

It altereth the sound of all the vowells, euen quite thorough one or mo consonants as, máde, stéme, éche, kínde, strípe, óre, cúre, tóste sound sharp with the qualifying E in their end: whereas, màd, stèm, èch, frind, strip, or, cut, tost, contract of tossed sound flat without the same E, And therefor the same loud and sharp sound in the word, calleth still for the qualifying e, in the end, as the flat and short nedeth it not. It qualifyeth no ending vowell, bycause it followeth none in the end, sauing i. as in daie, maie, saie, trewlie, safetie, where it maketh i, either not to be heard, or verie gentlie to be heard, which otherwise would sound loud and sharp, and must be expressed by y. as, deny, aby, ally. Which kinde of writing shalbe noted hereafter. It altereth also the force of, c, g, s, tho it sound not after them, as in hence, for that, which might sound henk, if anie word ended in c. in swinge differing from swing, in vse differing from vs.

Mulcaster also formulated the rule that a double letter, when final, indicated a short vowel in English, while the absence of doubling and the presence of silent ⟨e⟩ made the vowel long. In modern English, this rule is most prominent in its effects on the written "a" series:

- gal, gall, gale (/ɡæl, /ɡɔːl/, /ɡeɪl/).

Digraphs are sometimes treated as single letters for purposes of this rule:

- bath, bathe (/bæθ/, /beɪð/)
- breath, breathe (/bɹɛθ/, /bɹið/)
- cloth, clothe (/klɔθ/, /kloʊð/)

== In popular culture ==
- Tom Lehrer wrote a song called "Silent E" for the children's television series The Electric Company in 1971. In it, he asks the musical questions:
  Who can turn a căn into a cānɇ?
  Who can turn a păn into a pānɇ?
  It's not too hard to see.
  It's Silent "E"!
- A character is named "Silent E" in Between the Lions.
- A series of similar songs about "Magic E" was featured in the British educational series Look and Read between 1974 and 1994, written by Roger Limb and Rosanna Hibbert and performed by Derek Griffiths.
- In Alphablocks, Magic E is E's impish alter-ego, with a black ninja outfit and a top hat. He does not speak, but in the episode Magic, he sings a song about himself while he causes mischief.
- In The Electric Company (2009 TV series), Lin-Manuel Miranda raps "Silent E is a Ninja".

== See also ==
- I before E except after C
- Silent letter
- Albanian language § Sounds, the Gheg dialect of Albanian also uses "silent e" to mark long vowels earlier in the word
