= Comparison of software saving web pages for offline use =

A number of proprietary software products are available for saving web pages for later use offline. They vary in terms of the techniques used for saving, what types of content can be saved, the format and compression of the saved files, provision for working with already saved content, and in other ways.

== HTML content ==
Name	Technology	Completeness of saved content	Support for collections	Ease of adding to existing collections	Navigable between saved pages in offline	Format of saved files; open/proprietary	Compression	Notes
wget	command line application	images and CSS (if -p option is used), but no client-side generated HTML content	Yes	?	Yes, if -k option is used	Open (HTML or WARC)	Yes, if WARC files are used	
HTTrack	command line application has WinHTTrack for Windows and WebHTTrack for Linux/BSD/Unix GUI front-ends	?	?	?	Yes. Links all remade so open your locally stored pages for the site you download	Open. Standard HTML pages saved in a folder. Click on index.html to open home page	No	Many options to let you refine what you save.
Tenmax's Teleport	windows desktop application and scriptable tools for web crawling and archiving	multimedia (except streaming files), CSS, limited support for javascript events and cookies; shockwave/flash content is downloaded but not crawled	?	?	Yes	Open. Standard HTML pages saved in a folder. Click on index.html to open home page	No	supports advanced filtering options and authentication
ScrapBook	Firefox extension	See note (Note: Saved content: Default: images, CSS and other static content; clientside-generated HTML content—all saved fine; Optionally: sound (MP3, WAV, RAM, WMA); video (MPG, AVI, MOV, WMV); archives (ZIP, LZH, RAR, JAR, XPI); java - but can be problematic; custom document extensions (e.g. PDF))	Yes	Easy	Yes: If those pages were saved in scrapbook	Proprietary catalog; regular HTML and content for each page	No	See note (Note: Extra features: Search across collections; Known issues: saved pages embedding TED.com presentations (incl. pages on TED.com) cannot be played even when online; selecting a piece of page will save only selected piece — inconvenient when you change page title with a quote from the page; doesn't work with Firefox Quantum at the moment)
Mozilla Archive Format	Firefox extension	Images, CSS and other static content; clientside-generated HTML content saved fine	Yes	Impossible	No	MAFF (=ZIP of regular HTML and web content)	Always	The Mozilla Archive Format add-on is no longer maintained since September 5, 2018.
Read Later Fast	Google Chrome extension	Stylesheets are saved incompletely or not at all	No	—N/a	No	Proprietary; restricted to Google Chrome profile location	No	
PageArchiver	Google Chrome extension	Video and audio files (via Flash or HTML5) are not saved	Yes	Yes (import/export features)	No	Open; regular HTML for pages, regular zip file for catalog	Yes for catalog	
Archia's Web Page Archiver	E-mail based on-line service	See note (Note: Saved content: Images, CSS and other static content, sound (MP3, WAV, RAM, WMA), video (MPG, AVI, MOV, WMV), archives (ZIP, LZH, RAR, JAR, XPI), custom document extensions (e.g. PDF))	No	No	No	Open	Yes	

== See also ==
- Comparison of web annotation systems
- Offline reader
- Progressive web application

== Video ==
To save video embedded on web sites (e.g. YouTube), there are video download extensions for Firefox (including Download Helper) and Chrome.
