= NAVCIS =

NAVCIS or Navcis can mean:

- NavCIS, the former CompuServe Navigator
- NAVCIS, the British National Vehicle Crime Intelligence Service
