= Christopher Dunn (computer programmer) =

British writer and computer enthusiast

- Born: ca. 1956
- Other names: Chris Dunn, Chrisdos
- Occupation: Computer technician
- Spouse: Pamela Jensen

Christopher Dunn is a computer enthusiast noted for his involvement with CompuServe, and for the first high-profile online courtship leading to marriage in the United States.

== CompuServe contributions ==
Around 1980, Dunn discovered CompuServe, an early online service popular with owners of 8-bit microcomputers. He served as the sysop of CBIG, a special interest group for users of CompuServe's CB Simulator chat service, where he went by the handle "Chrisdos". Dunn was the author of MU, an unofficial menu and mail notification program that ran on CompuServe's DEC PDP servers. (By 1984, it was no longer possible for customers to install and run server-side programs; MU was the sole exception.) In 1985, Dunn authored CBterm/C64, a terminal emulator for the Commodore 64 noted for its ability to directly display CompuServe's RLE graphics.

== Online dating ==
In 1982, Dunn met Pamela Jensen through the CB Simulator. At the time, the 26-year-old Dunn lived in Queens, where he dialled into CompuServe using a Heathkit CRT terminal and a Teletype Model 33. Jensen, whose handle "Zebra 3" was borrowed from Starsky & Hutch, was 30 years old and working in Chicago as an animal keeper at the Lincoln Park Zoo. The two soon hit it off and began exchanging private messages. They met in person for the first time on April 23, 1982, when Dunn flew to Chicago to attend a house party hosted by Jensen. Both were immediately smitten, and on their next visit, Dunn proposed.

At the time, online dating was in its infancy, and the pair's online courtship caused a nationwide media sensation. The couple appeared on Good Morning America, The Phil Donahue Show, and 20/20, and were the subject of articles in several newspapers and magazines, including The New York Times. "Cupid and Computers Conquer All", a biographical article in the Chicago Tribune, was released on the AP wire and widely reprinted in the American and international press.

The couple married in April 1983, a year after their first real-life meeting, in a small civil ceremony attended by three friends and five television news crews. Dunn left his job with a security firm in New York City and moved in with Pam in Chicago, where he became the technical operations manager of the Peggy Notebaert Nature Museum. Though commentators—including Dunn's father—were initially sure that the marriage wouldn't last, the couple celebrated their 25th anniversary in 2008.

Though Dunn and Jensen's online courtship was the first to receive widespread media coverage in the United States, the couple did not exchange vows electronically. Shortly before his own real-life wedding, however, Dunn attended what may have been the world's first online wedding, held on CompuServe's CB channel 14 for George "Mike" Stickles and Debbie "Silver" Fuhrman.
