= Offline reader =

Computer software

An offline reader (sometimes called an offline browser or offline navigator) is computer software that downloads e-mail, newsgroup posts or web pages, making them available when the computer is offline: not connected to a server. (Note: This includes the user not being connected to a dial-up server, not having Internet access and a server on the Internet that is unavailable.) Offline readers are useful for portable computers and dial-up access.

== Variations ==
=== Website-mirroring software ===
Website mirroring software is software that allows for the download of a copy of an entire website to the local hard disk for offline browsing. In effect, the downloaded copy serves as a mirror of the original site. Web crawler software such as Wget can be used to generate a site mirror.

=== Offline mail and news readers ===
The Mozilla Thunderbird email client

Offline mail readers are computer programs that allow users to read electronic mail or other messages (for example, those on bulletin board systems) with a minimum of connection time to the server storing the messages. BBS servers accomplished this by packaging up multiple messages into a compressed file, e.g., a QWK packet, for the user to download using, e.g., Xmodem, Ymodem, Zmodem, and then disconnect. The user reads and replies to the messages locally and packages up and uploads any replies or new messages back to the server upon the next connection. Internet mail servers using POP3 or IMAP4 send the messages uncompressed as part of the protocol, and outbound messages using SMTP are also uncompressed. Offline news readers using NNTP are similar, but the messages are organized into news groups.

Most e-mail protocols, like the common POP3 and IMAP4 used for internet mail, need be on-line only during message transfer; the same applies to the NNTP protocol used by Usenet (Network news). Most end-user mailers, such as Outlook Express and AOL, can be used offline even if they are mainly intended to be used online, but some mailers such as Juno are mainly intended to be used offline.

Offline mail readers are generally considered to be those systems that did not originally offer such functionality, notably on bulletin board systems where toll charges and tying up telephone lines were a major concern. Users of large networks such as FidoNet regularly used offline mail readers, and it was also used for UseNet messages on the internet, which is also an online system. The two most common formats for FidoNet BBS's were Blue Wave and QWK. Less well-known examples include Silver Xpress's OPX, XRS, OMEN, SOUP and ZipMail.

== List ==
Name	Use	Publisher	License	Platform	
Blue Wave	BBS (Blue Wave)	Fred Rappuhn and George Hatchew	Shareware	DOS	(Note: The file format they developed would be one of the two standards for BBS use, the other being QWK which ultimately became more popular.)
Freddie	BBS (QWK)	Kem Tekinay	Shareware	Classic Mac OS	(Note: Normally used with ZTerm and ZipIt to completely automate the process.)
GoldED	BBS (FidoNet)	Odinn Sørensen	GPL	DOS	(Note: Fidonet mail reader. Did not use QWK or Blue Wave; it directly read and wrote FidoNet files.)
Golden CommPass (GCP)	CompuServe	Creative Systems Programming Corporation	Paid	OS/2	(Note: Mail reader for Compuserve)
Hamster	Mathias Dolidon	Web	Free software	Windows, Linux, OS X, Unix	
HTTrack	HTTrack.com	Web	Free software	Windows, Linux, OS X, Unix	
Leech	Web	Universal Commerce, Issaquah	Shareware	Windows	
MR/2 and MR/2 PM	BBS	Knight Writer Software Company	Shareware	OS/2	(Note: BBS reader)
MR/2 ICE	Internet mail and news	Secant / Alphacat	Shareware	OS/2, Windows	(Note: Internet mail and news reader)
Offline Explorer	Web	Metaproducts	Paid	Windows	
OLX (Off Line Xpress)	BBS (QWK)	Mustang Software, Inc.	Paid	DOS	(Note: The free test subset of OLX is called Off Line Xpress - Test Drive (OLX-TD))
ScrapBook	Web	Mozilla Add-ons	Freeware	Cross-platform	
TapCIS	CompuServe	Support Group, Inc.	Shareware	DOS	

== See also ==
- Online and offline
- Cache manifest in HTML5 (deprecated in favor of service workers)
- Progressive web application
- Kiwix, Wikipedia offline reader
- WebWhacker
- Comparison of software saving Web pages for offline use
