= Hard and soft C =

Pronunciation of "C" in Latin-based orthographies

In the Latin-based orthographies of many European languages, including English, a distinction between hard and soft ⟨c⟩ occurs in which ⟨c⟩ represents two distinct phonemes. The sound of a hard ⟨c⟩ often precedes the non-front vowels ⟨a⟩, ⟨o⟩ and ⟨u⟩, and is that of the voiceless velar stop, /k/ (as in car). The sound of a soft ⟨c⟩, typically before ⟨e⟩, ⟨i⟩ and ⟨y⟩, may be a fricative or affricate, depending on the language. In English (and not coincidentally also French), the sound of soft ⟨c⟩ is /s/ (as in cell).

There was no soft ⟨c⟩ in classical Latin, where it was always pronounced as /k/.

== History ==
This alternation is caused by a historical palatalization of /k/ which took place in Late Latin, and led to a change in the pronunciation of the sound [k] before the front vowels [e] and [i]. Later, other languages not directly descended from Latin, such as English, inherited this feature as an orthographic convention.

== English ==
=== General overview ===
In English orthography, the pronunciation of hard ⟨c⟩ is /k/ and of soft ⟨c⟩ is generally /s/. Yod-coalescence has altered instances of /sj/ – particularly in unstressed syllables – to /ʃ/ in most varieties of English, affecting words such as ocean, logician, and magician. Generally, the soft ⟨c⟩ pronunciation occurs before ⟨i e y⟩; it also occurs before ⟨ae⟩ and ⟨oe⟩ in a number of Greek and Latin loanwords (such as coelacanth, caecum, and caesar). The hard ⟨c⟩ pronunciation occurs everywhere else except in the letter combinations ⟨sc⟩, ⟨ch⟩, and ⟨sch⟩ which have their own pronunciation rules. ⟨cc⟩ generally represents /ks/ before ⟨i e y⟩, as in accident, succeed, and coccyx.

There are exceptions to the general rules of hard and soft ⟨c⟩:

- The ⟨c⟩ in the words Celt and Celtic was traditionally soft, but since the late 19th century, the hard pronunciation has also been recognized in conscious imitation of the classical Latin pronunciation of Celtae; see Pronunciation of Celtic. Welsh and Gaelic loanwords in English which retain their native spelling, such as ceilidh, cistvaen (alternatively spelled ⟨kistvaen⟩), and Cymric, are also pronounced hard. The Irish and Welsh languages have no letter K, so all ⟨c⟩s are pronounced hard. Notable exceptions include Celtic F.C. and the basketball team the Boston Celtics, where the soft pronunciation prevails.
- The ⟨c⟩ is hard in a handful of words like arcing, synced/syncing, chicer (/ʃiːkər/), and Quebecer (alternatively spelled ⟨Quebecker⟩) that involve a word normally spelled with a final ⟨c⟩ followed by an affix starting with ⟨e⟩ or ⟨i⟩; soccer and recce also have a hard ⟨c⟩.
- The ⟨sc⟩ in sceptic, and its derivatives such as sceptical and scepticism, represents /sk/. These words are alternative spellings to ⟨skeptical⟩ and ⟨skepticism⟩, respectively.
- The ⟨cc⟩ of flaccid now sometimes represents a single soft ⟨c⟩ pronunciation /ˈflæsɪd/, which is a simplification of /ˈflæksɪd/.
- The ⟨c⟩ is silent before ⟨t⟩ in indict and its derivatives such as indictment, in the name of the U.S. state Connecticut, and in some pronunciations of Arctic and Antarctic.
- In a few cases such as facade and limacon, a soft ⟨c⟩ appears before ⟨a o u⟩ and is optionally indicated to be soft by means of attaching a cedilla to its bottom, giving façade, limaçon.
- The second ⟨c⟩ in supercalifragilisticexpialidocious (a humorous invented word from the eponymous Mary Poppins soundtrack song) is pronounced as a hard ⟨c⟩, separately from the following vowel on the syllable represented by ⟨ex⟩, as it is an assemblage of parts from existing words, here the suffix -istic.

A silent ⟨e⟩ can occur after ⟨c⟩ at the end of a word or component root word part of a larger word. The ⟨e⟩ can serve a marking function indicating that the preceding ⟨c⟩ is soft, as in dance and enhancement. The silent ⟨e⟩ often additionally indicates that the vowel before ⟨c⟩ is a long vowel, as in rice, mace, and pacesetter.

When adding suffixes with ⟨i e y⟩ (such as -ed, -ing, -er, -est, -ism, -ist, -y, and -ie) to root words ending in ⟨ce⟩, the final ⟨e⟩ of the root word is often dropped and the root word retains the soft ⟨c⟩ pronunciation as in danced, dancing, and dancer from dance. The suffixes -ify and -ise/-ize can be added to most nouns and adjectives to form new verbs. The pronunciation of ⟨c⟩ in newly coined words using these suffixes is not always clear. The digraph ⟨ck⟩ may be used to retain the hard ⟨c⟩ pronunciation in inflections and derivatives of a word such as trafficking from the verb traffic.

There are several cases in English in which hard and soft ⟨c⟩ alternate with the addition of suffixes as in critic/criticism and electric/electricity (electrician has a soft ⟨c⟩ pronunciation of /ʃ/ because of yod-coalescence).

=== Letter combinations ===
A number of two-letter combinations or digraphs follow distinct pronunciation patterns and do not follow the hard-soft distinction of ⟨c⟩. For example, ⟨ch⟩ may represent /tʃ/ (as in chicken), /ʃ/ (as in chef), or /k/ (as in choir). Other letter combinations that don't follow the paradigm include ⟨cz⟩, ⟨sc⟩, ⟨cs⟩, ⟨tch⟩, ⟨sch⟩, and ⟨tsch⟩. These come primarily from loanwords.

Besides a few examples (recce, soccer, Speccy), ⟨cc⟩ fits neatly with the regular rules of ⟨c⟩: Before ⟨i e y⟩, the second ⟨c⟩ is soft while the first is hard. Words such as accept and success are pronounced with /ks/ and words such as succumb and accommodate are pronounced with /k/. Exceptions include loanwords from Italian such as cappuccino with /tʃ/ for ⟨cc⟩.

Many placenames and other proper nouns with -cester (from Old English ceaster, meaning Roman station or walled town) are pronounced with /stər/ such as Worcester (/ˈwʊstər/), Gloucester (/ˈɡlɒstər/ or /ˈɡlɔːstər/), and Leicester (/ˈlɛstər/). The /s/ pronunciation occurs as a combination of a historically soft ⟨c⟩ pronunciation and historical elision of the first vowel of the suffix.

=== Italian loanwords ===
The original spellings and pronunciations of Italian loanwords have mostly been kept. Many English words that have been borrowed from Italian follow a distinct set of pronunciation rules corresponding to those in Italian. The Italian soft ⟨c⟩ pronunciation is /tʃ/ (as in cello and ciao), while the hard ⟨c⟩ is the same as in English. Italian orthography uses ⟨ch⟩ to indicate a hard pronunciation before ⟨e⟩ or ⟨i⟩, analogous to English using ⟨k⟩ (as in kill and keep) and ⟨qu⟩ (as in mosquito and queue).

In addition to hard and soft ⟨c⟩, the digraph ⟨sc⟩ represents /ʃ/ or, if between vowels, /ʃʃ/ when followed by ⟨e⟩ or ⟨i⟩ (as in scena or sciarpa with /ʃ/, crescendo and fascia with /ʃʃ/). Meanwhile, ⟨sch⟩ in Italian always represents /sk/, not /ʃ/, but English-speakers commonly pronounce it as /ʃ/, perhaps in part due to familiarity with the German pronunciation; thus bruschetta often is realized not with the /k/ of Italian /brusˈketta/, but with /ʃ/. Italian uses ⟨cc⟩ to indicate the geminate /kk/ before ⟨a⟩, ⟨o⟩, ⟨u⟩ or /ttʃ/ before ⟨e⟩ or ⟨i⟩. English does not have geminate phonemes, so loanwords with soft ⟨cc⟩ that are pronounced with /ttʃ/ in Italian, such as cappuccino, are normally pronounced in English with the geminate simplified: /ˌkæpəˈtʃinoʊ/.

=== Suffixation issues ===
Rarely, the use of unusual suffixed forms to create neologisms occurs. For example, the words ace and race are both standard words but adding -ate or -age (both productive affixes in English) would create spellings that seem to indicate hard ⟨c⟩ pronunciations (acate and racage). Potential remedies include altering the spelling to asate and rasage, though no standard conventions exist.

=== Replacement with ⟨k⟩ ===
Sometimes ⟨k⟩ replaces ⟨c⟩, ⟨ck⟩, or ⟨qu⟩, as a trope for giving words a hard-edged or whimsical feel, in addition to enabling the trademarking of commercial names. Examples include the Mortal Kombat franchise and product names such as Kool-Aid and Nesquik. More intensely, this use of ⟨k⟩ has also been used to give extremist or racist connotations. Examples include Amerika or Amerikkka (where the ⟨k⟩ is reminiscent of German and the totalitarian Nazi regime and the racist Ku Klux Klan, respectively).

== Other languages ==
Most modern Romance languages make the hard-soft distinction with ⟨c⟩, except a few that have undergone spelling reforms such as Ladino and archaic variants like Sardinian. Some non-Romance languages like German, Danish and Dutch use ⟨c⟩ in loanwords and also make this distinction. The soft ⟨c⟩ pronunciation, which occurs before ⟨i⟩, ⟨e⟩ and ⟨y⟩, is:

1. /tʃ/ in Italian, Romanian, and Old English;
2. /s/ in English, French, Portuguese, Catalan, Latin American Spanish, and in words loaned into Dutch and the Scandinavian languages;
3. /θ/ in European and Equatoguinean Spanish;
4. /ts/ in words loaned into German. This is one of the more archaic pronunciations, and was also the pronunciation in Old Spanish, Old French and other historical languages where it is now pronounced /s/. Most languages in eastern and central Europe came to use ⟨c⟩ only for /ts/, and ⟨k⟩ only for /k/ (this would include those Slavic languages that use the Latin script, Hungarian, Albanian, and the Baltic languages).

The hard ⟨c⟩ occurs in all other positions and represents /k/ in all these aforementioned languages, including in the case of ⟨c⟩ that comes before the Romanian letter î, which is different from i.

In Italian and Romanian, the orthographic convention for representing /k/ before front vowels is to add ⟨h⟩ (Italian chiaro, [ˈkjaːro] 'clear'). ⟨qu⟩ is used to accomplish the same purpose in Catalan, Portuguese, Spanish, and French. Rarely, the use of unusual suffixed forms to create neologisms occurs. For example, the words saco and taco are both standard words but adding -es or -ez (both productive affixes in Spanish) would create spellings that seem to indicate soft ⟨c⟩ pronunciations. (saces and tacez). Potential remedies include altering the spelling to saques and taquez, though no standard conventions exist. In French, Catalan, Portuguese, and Old Spanish a cedilla is used to indicate a soft /s/ pronunciation when it would otherwise seem to be hard. (French garçon [ɡaʁsɔ̃], 'boy'; Portuguese coração [kuɾɐˈsɐ̃w], 'heart'; Catalan caçar [kəˈsa], 'to hunt'). Spanish is similar, though ⟨z⟩ is used instead of ⟨ç⟩ (e.g. corazón [koɾaˈθon], 'heart'). However, this is essentially equivalent because despite common misconception the symbol ⟨Ç⟩ is actually derived from a Visigothic Z.

In the orthographies of Irish and Scottish Gaelic, most consonants including ⟨c⟩ have a "broad" (velarized) vs "slender" distinction (palatalized) for many of its other consonants generally based on whether the nearest vowel is ⟨a o u⟩ or ⟨i e⟩, respectively. In Irish, ⟨c⟩ usually represents a hard /k/, but represents /c/ before e or i, or after i. In Scottish Gaelic, broad ⟨c⟩ is one of /kʰ ʰk ʰk k/, and slender ⟨c⟩ is one of /kʰʲ ʰkʲ ʰkʲ kʲ/, depending on the phonetic environment.

A number of orthographies do not make a hard-soft distinction. The ⟨c⟩ is always hard in Welsh but is always soft in Slavic languages, Hungarian, and in Hanyu Pinyin transcription system of Mandarin Chinese, where it represents /tsʰ/ and in Indonesian and many of the transcriptions of the languages of India such as Sanskrit and Hindi, where it always represents /tʃ/. See also C § Other languages.

Swedish has a similar phenomenon with hard and soft ⟨k⟩: this results from a similar historical palatalization development. Soft ⟨k⟩ is typically a palatal [ç] or an alveolo-palatal [ɕ], and occurs before not only ⟨i⟩, ⟨e⟩ and ⟨y⟩, but also ⟨j⟩, ⟨ä⟩, and ⟨ö⟩. Another similar system with hard and soft ⟨k⟩ is found in Faroese with the hard ⟨k⟩ being /kʰ/ and the soft being /t͡ʃʰ/, and Turkish where the soft ⟨k⟩ is /c/.

The Vietnamese alphabet, while based on European orthographies, does not have a hard or a soft ⟨c⟩ per se. The letter ⟨c⟩, outside of the digraph ⟨ch⟩, always represents a hard /k/ sound. However, it never occurs in "soft positions", i.e. before ⟨i y e ê⟩, where ⟨k⟩ is used instead, while ⟨k⟩ never occurs elsewhere except in the digraph ⟨kh⟩ and a few loanwords. The names of the letters "c" and "k" are borrowed from Europe and those letters don't even occur in their own letter names (C: xê and K: ca.) Hồ Chí Minh had proposed a simplified spelling, as shown in the title of one of his books, 'Đường kách mệnh'.

Old Bohemian had hard c, but it was pronounced [x], as in Schecowitz, Tocowitz, and Crudim.

== See also ==
- C
- English orthography
- I before E except after C
- Hard and soft G
