= CB Simulator =

Online chat service

CompuServe CB Simulator was the first dedicated online chat service that was widely available to the public. It was developed by a CompuServe executive, Alexander "Sandy" Trevor, and released by CompuServe on February 21, 1980, as the first public, commercial multi-user chat program.

At that time, most people were familiar with citizens band radio, often abbreviated as CB radio, but multi-user chat and instant messaging were largely unknown. CompuServe CB used the CB radio paradigm to help users understand the new concept. Like CB radio, it had 40 "channels" and commands like "tune", "squelch", and "monitor". CompuServe CB quickly became the largest single product on CompuServe despite virtually no marketing. When 40 channels was not enough, additional "bands" were added, such as the "Adult" band.

The first online wedding occurred on CompuServe CB, and worldwide fans organized events to meet in the "real world" people they had met in CB. Compuserve's CBIG (CB Interest Group) Sysop Chris Dunn (ChrisDos) met his wife Pamela (Zebra3) there in the early 1980s, eventually being featured on the Phil Donahue Show. Later, enhancements to CompuServe CB were made to enable multiplayer games, digital pictures, multimedia, and large conferences. For example, Mick Jagger of the Rolling Stones held the first online multimedia conference using CompuServe CB from London on December 7, 1995.

One of the first online weddings occurred between *MilesTeg* and *Cinderella* on May 4, 1991. While the couple said their vows at the Silver Bells Wedding Chapel in Las Vegas, *TennesseeBunny* was dialed in with a laptop computer and a 2,400-bit-per-second modem and broadcast the event play by play. Later the couple celebrated at the "reception" during the Vegas CB Bash at the Palace Station Hotel. The wedding was attended by 20+ CB regulars in person and over 50 virtual guests online. The couple were still married as of 2019.

The CompuServe CB Simulator was also the setting for The Strange Case of the Electronic Lover, an ethnographic study by Lindsy Van Gelder examining the phenomenon of gender-bending identity in the early days of online chatrooms, and how one user's exposure as a man pretending to be female influenced a user community.

The CB Simulator continued in service until the shuttering of the CompuServe Classic service in 2009.

== Associated software ==
In October 1983, CBSIM CB Simulator was written and released by Jerry Thomas Hunter as the first publicly accessible CB Simulator software available for privately operated computer bulletin board systems (BBSs). The program was released as "freeware" as an add-on module (or "Door") for the popular RBBS-PC. It enabled users connected on one node of a bulletin board system to "chat" with users dialed in on other nodes. Initially, CBSIM supported a maximum of 32 concurrent nodes (connected users), and allowed dynamic creation and cataloging of "channels" by the users of the BBS on which it was installed. The source code was released to the public from the inception of the CBSIM project, and this source code quickly became the foundation for multi-node chat systems embedded in other popular BBS software products.

In the mid-1980s, a version of CB was written for the DEC RSTS/E operating system. It was accomplished by using a rare shared R/W Runtime system, to keep track of users in the CB simulator. This was one of the first and only usage of a shared memory area, mapped to Basic-Plus virtual arrays, to keep track of a program usage. Using CB, you could communicate to other users across DECnet to other nodes of the system. Built in was also a pseudo-tty module, which allowed you to execute programs, while 'chatting' in CB on the same terminal. The software was made available though DECUS SIG RSTS users group.

Pat Phelps (CompuServe CB admin), Interview 1991
