= WebWhacker =

Offline browser

- Developer: ForeFront Group
- Release: January 4, 1996
- Stable release: 5.0 / 2002; 24 years ago
- Operating system: Windows 3.1, Windows 9x, Windows 2000, Windows XP, Classic Mac OS
- Available in: English
- Type: Offline browser
- License: Trialware
- Website: bluesquirrel.com/products/webwhacker/

The WebWhacker was an early offline browser.

== Reception ==
The WebWhacker was well received, though it received criticism for the inability to adjust the size of the toolbar, and not enough control as to which pages get whacked.

== See also ==
- WebEx
- ClearWeb
