= NavCIS =

NavCIS was CompuServe Information Service's client program for automated connections to the CompuServe Information Service, at a time when online use was priced per minute. It was largely an offline reader, downloading both email and new messages from selected forums, and then disconnecting. The user could then read and reply to these messages offline, and send all of their replies back in a similarly quick connection. Unlike most offline readers, NavCIS also allowed the user to select files for upload and download, and included a system for scripting the session.

Originally called ForCIS, it was based on the host computer's interface. NavCIS was the first email or forum client to feature WYSIWYG in the early 1990s. It was available as a GUI on both MS-DOS and Microsoft Windows. The very similar CompuServe Navigator was a similar system for the Macintosh.

Support for NavCIS lagged the interactive CompuServe Information Manager (CIM), which kept users online but allowed GUI access to most of CompuServe's more popular features like chat and (some) online games. NavCIS stopped working when the original CompuServe interface was shut down around 2001.

== Description ==
The NavCIS system was based around its session files, which described the actions to be carried out during a single connection. These files contained the basic connection information for the modem and the phone number to call, as well as a series of commands that visited different areas in CIS. The script files were created by clicking on a number of buttons in a settings window, allowing the user to navigate a map of the CIS system, grouped into subject areas. For instance, one could give instructions to retrieve new email from the email button. By clicking on the buttons and selecting various actions, the user builds a script of what actions will be carried out as part of this session. Once the session file is set up and saved, the user has the software connect. It then runs through the commands in the session file one by one, completing the tasks and moving any resulting data to the local machine. Once complete, the interface offers access to that data through commands in the menu bar.

In contrast to systems used with bulletin board systems, NavCIS provided access to much of the CIS environment. There were commands to update the forums list, for instance, so the list of available message areas in the client was always up to date. Likewise, the system could be instructed to download a list of new files in a selected library, and then allow the user to select files of interest for download on the next connection. The system also included a command to pause the script and open a terminal window, allowing direct interaction with CIS until the window was closed and the script continued.

== Other clients ==
- TapCIS
- CompuServe Information Manager
- OzWin
- AutoSIG
