= B protocol =

- Communication protocol
- Purpose: file transfer protocol
- Developer(s): CompuServe Information Service
- Introduction: 1979; 47 years ago
- Hardware: modems

The B protocol, or CIS B, is a file transfer protocol developed for the CompuServe Information Service, and implemented in 1981. The protocol was later expanded in the QuickB version (which was an asynchronous version of the standard protocol) and later the enhanced B Plus version. It was a fairly advanced protocol for its era, supporting efficient transfers of files, commands and other data as well, and could be used in both directions at the same time in certain modes. These advanced features were not widely used, but could be found in a small number of client-side packages.

Since B protocol was designed only to work within the CompuServe, most third-party communications clients of the day were not compatible with it. Notable exceptions were Tera Term and Datastorm's ProComm Plus on the PC which featured the ability to listen for the Enquire command on the active communications port, and ZTerm on the Mac which allowed auto-starting transfers. This development was part of a wider trend of using external communications applications in conjunction with online services.

== History ==
As part of a 1979 project to provide low-cost graphical terminals for the farming community, CompuServe and Tandy worked together to produce a system known as "AgVision", or sometimes "VideoTex". As part of this project, CompuServe introduced a system known as CompuServe A protocol, based on Bisync, to provide error-free transport of the commands and data. The first version was running in 1980, but it had a number of problems. That same year, the AgVision project was cancelled. Tandy took the terminal, removed the modem and changed the case color, and launched that as the TRS-80 Color Computer.

In 1981, an effort began to convert the A protocol concepts to a more general form intended primarily for file transfers. This was released as the original B protocol in 1982. There were two revisions of the original standard. The rapid growth in power of microcomputers during this period led to a number of new features, notably larger packet sizes and sliding window support. B Plus focussed the overall concept primarily on supporting downloads from CompuServe, as opposed to user-to-user transfers or as a general-purpose protocol. Among the key additions was the ability for the host, normally one of CompuServe's mainframe computers, to send a message to the user's computer to start the transfer. This simplified the process of downloading a file; as soon as the user selected a file to download from the host, the host sent a message that started the transfer with no further work on the user's side.

== Description ==
The following description is based on the B Plus documentation and does not explicitly refer to the earlier (and rare) B.

=== General concept ===
B Plus is a sliding window protocol with variable-sized packets between 128 and 2048 bytes and windows of one or two packets. The addition of the larger 1k and 2k block sizes and sliding windows were the primary changes in structure between B and B Plus.

All potential problematic control characters were always quoted, a requirement because many people accessed CompuServe over non-8-bit-clean packet services such as Tymnet or CompuServe's internal wide-area network. B Plus also used any one of four types of error checking.

=== Packet structure ===
The basic packet structure consisted of five parts:

B Plus packet structure
Lead-in	<DLE>B
Sequence #	<0x30> through <0x39>
Type	Single byte
Body	zero to 2048 bytes
Trailer	<ETX>Check Value
	(may be followed by <RS>)

The lead-in serves the same purpose as the "header" in most protocols, indicating that the data following is a B Plus packet. The sequence number is a simple way of making sure packets are received in the correct order on reception. The small number range used for the sequence does not present a problem because packets even "one out of order" will trigger a re-send or abort, so there is no possibility of the "wrong 0x30" being received, ten packets later.

=== Quoting ===
Characters in the Body or Trailer are "quoted". Officially only a few characters are quoted, <ETX>, <ENQ>, <DLE>, <DC1> (XON), <DC3> (XOFF) and NAK. Typically three other characters are quoted as well, <RS>, <DC1> + 0x80 and <DC3> + 0x80. Characters are quoted by adding 0x40 to their ordinal value, and prefixing them with the <DLE> character. For instance, the <ETX> character (0x03) would be sent as <DLE>C.

The Check Value was quoted, as were the contents it checked against, but the value inside was the check of the unquoted values. That means that Body had to be extracted and unquoted before the Check Value could be calculated on the receiving end.

=== Error correction ===
Four types of Check Values were allowed, the original XMODEM checksum, a slightly modified version of the cyclic redundancy check (CRC) used in XMODEM-CRC, or the CCITT CRC-16 or CRC-32. When using the CCITT CRC, the Trailer also included an optional <RS> character at the end as a "network break" (send now), although it is not clear why this was not supported with other Trailer types.

=== Packet types ===
B Plus defined several different packet types, as opposed to most protocols which included only one. These packets were used both for data transfer as well as secure delivery of commands and protocol setup information. The four types were:

B Plus packet types
Transport Parameters	+
File Transfer	T
Data	N
Failure	F

The most common packets, in terms of overall number transferred, are T packets carrying the data for a file transfer. These packets have no further semantic value and are formatted as described above. The T packets also include "subtypes", Tr for "transfer resume", TF for "transfer failure" if the resume did not match the partially downloaded file, and TI for "transfer information", which sent details on the file being transferred. Most protocols would send file information as a special "zeroth packet" in the transfer stream itself, whereas in B Plus this was handled by a separate packet type and effectively out of the transfer stream itself, although there was no real difference in practice.

The Failure packet allows the sender to indicate various problems inside the packet stream. The packet normally contains a single "known" character, but can also include an informational message following this character. The most common Failure packet is the A(bort), allowing the user to terminate transfers on request. Other failures included (C)apacity failure (out of disk space) and (M)issing file, among others.

The Transport Parameters was sent typically only once, during the initial connection phase. This packet contained a number of details in a known format that synchronized what features both ends of the connection were capable of using. It was during this phase that the type of Check Value was selected, for instance.

=== Transport Layer ===
In addition to the normal packet types outlined above, B Plus also included separate types for sending commands to CIS via the B Plus error-corrected layer. The M packet was a single data packet, while L was also a data packet but indicated that the stream of data was now complete. This had to be indicated in this fashion because, unlike a file transfer, the amount of data being sent would not be known in advance.

The contents of these packets were free-form and were not defined in the B Plus documentation itself. However the basic concept was that the user's terminal program would respond to CIS's interrogation sequence (sent when the user first logged in) by starting a transfer with the M type. This stream would be used to send commands to the CIS host, which would respond by opening another transport layer stream back to the terminal program. These streams were "sequenceless", and read out in the order they were received. Errors or Failure packets caused both channels to abort. The channel could be closed by sending an L type packet, for "last".

Possibly the only user of the Transport Layer was CompuServe's own Host-Micro Interface (HMI) API. HMI defined a number of commands that could be used to drive CIS, along with the possible responses to them, bypassing the command line interface. Since error correction was being used as a side effect of being built on B Plus, the possibility of incorrectly interpreting the commands or potentially garbled responses was basically eliminated. CIS expanded HMI to allow control of most of the batch-oriented interface, including functions for e-mail, conferences and file transfers.

Transport Layer streams could not take place at the same time as file transfers, so in general terms the applications using the Transport Layer were fairly modal. For instance, CIS Navigator for the Mac, which was HMI based, allowed users to navigate CIS offline, setting up various e-mail and file transfers which would then be carried out in a single batch in order to reduce online time. The last step of the Navigator "run" would be to download files before logging off.

=== Control sequences ===
All protocols use the "backchannel" to send status information from the "receiver" back to the "sender". B Plus formalized this system, defining several "messages" that could be sent outside the packet structure. These included the typical DLE followed by a sequence number in order to acknowledge the correct reception of a packet. NAK was used to indicate an improperly received packet, which was responded to with acknowledge messages, <DLE><DLE>. <DLE>; paused the sender, while <DLE>+ aborted the stream.

The Enquire control sequence appears unique to B Plus. Consisting of a single <ENQ>, the Enquire was used both to start transfers as well as restart after receiving a NAK. In both cases the Enquire caused the receiver to reset its connection mode to the most basic possible transfer settings, and prepare for a transfer.

== See also ==
- VIDTEX
