= VIDTEX =

VIDTEX is a family of telecommunication software developed for CompuServe for use with its online dial-up service.

VIDTEX client software was available for Atari and Commodore 8-bit microcomputers, and was noted for its ability to directly display RLE graphics and its support for file transfers using the CompuServe B protocol. Its popularity led to third-party VIDTEX terminal emulators, such as CBterm/C64, as well as stand-alone programs for displaying VIDTEX graphics. Large collections of VIDTEX graphics could also be found on independently operated BBSes.
