= CompuServe, Inc. v. Patterson =

1996 U.S. appeals court case

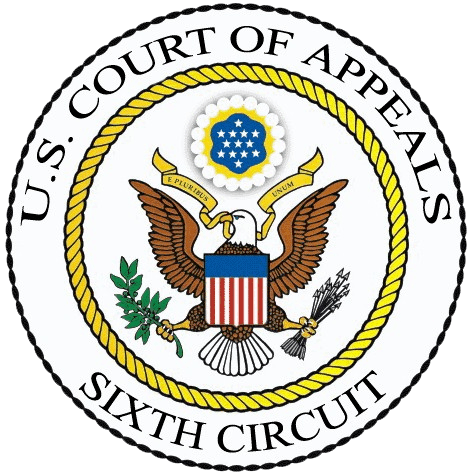
- Court: United States Court of Appeals for the Sixth Circuit
- Decided: July 22, 1996
- Citation: 89 F.3d 1257

Case history
- Prior action: The District court granted the defendant's motion for dismissal for lack of personal jurisdiction
- Appealed from: United States District Court for the Southern District of Ohio

Court membership
- Judges sitting: Bailey Brown, Cornelia Groefsema Kennedy, Harry W. Wellford

Case opinions
- The order granting Patterson's motion to dismiss for lack of personal jurisdiction was reversed because Patterson had sufficient contacts with Ohio through storing his software and utilizing CompuServe's advertisement network to grant personal jurisdiction.
- Decision by: Bailey Brown

Keywords
- Personal jurisdiction in internet cases in the United States Personal jurisdiction

CompuServe, Inc. v. Patterson was a court case heard before the Sixth Circuit Court of Appeals which held that contacts and contracts negotiated through the Internet with a party in a different state were sufficient to grant personal jurisdiction in that state. In particular, the court held that Patterson's use of storage, electronic transmission of files, and advertisement through CompuServe's network in Ohio were sufficient to grant Ohio personal jurisdiction over Patterson.

== Background ==
Richard Patterson, a resident of Texas, subscribed to CompuServe, Inc., an Internet service provider with its headquarters in Ohio. Under the business moniker FlashPoint Development, Patterson developed a software product designed to help people navigate around the Internet. In 1991, from Texas, Patterson entered into an agreement with CompuServe in which Patterson could store, transmit, and advertise shareware files through CompuServe. Other CompuServe subscribers could purchase Patterson's software through CompuServe, and CompuServe would collect a 15% fee and pay Patterson the remaining balance.

In 1993, CompuServe started marketing a software product similar to that of Patterson's with similar markings and names. In December 1993, Patterson informed CompuServe that he believed CompuServe's marketing of their product infringed his common law trademarks. While CompuServe changed its program's name, Patterson continued to complain. When Patterson demanded $100,000 to settle his claim, CompuServe filed a lawsuit seeking declaratory judgment in Ohio District Court.

== Legal proceedings ==
=== Trial court proceedings ===
Patterson responded to CompuServe's suit with a motion to dismiss, arguing that the Ohio court lacked personal jurisdiction. He supported this claim with an affidavit, stating that he had never visited Ohio, along with other facts that weighed against granting personal jurisdiction. CompuServe filed a memorandum in opposition along with supporting exhibits.

Based on these filings, the District Court granted Patterson's motion to dismiss for lack of personal jurisdiction, in what Judge Bailey would later deem "a thorough and thoughtful opinion." The trial court felt that the connection between Patterson in Texas and CompuServe in Ohio was "too tenuous to support the exercise of personal jurisdiction." CompuServe appealed.

=== Appellate court proceedings ===
Patterson filed no brief on appeal and did not appear at oral argument for the appellate hearing.

The court noted that individually, Patterson's sale of software in Ohio and entering into a contract with an Ohio company would be questionable grounds for exercising personal jurisdiction. The court then considered whether Ohio had the right to exercise jurisdiction under Ohio's long-arm statute, which uses a three-pronged test to determine if it is reasonable to exercise personal jurisdiction:

1. The defendant must have purposefully availed himself of the privilege of acting in the state
2. The legal action must have arisen from defendant's activities there
3. The acts of the defendant or consequences of his actions must have a sufficiently substantial connection to the state

The court ruled that all three prongs were satisfied, since Patterson had contracted with CompuServe and repeatedly sent his computer software to CompuServe in Ohio and advertised through CompuServe's network. As such, they reversed the district court's dismissal and remanded for further proceedings.

== Impact ==
The applicability of jurisdiction in cases involving activities over the Internet is significant because an out-of-state resident can very easily cause an impact in the state in question. This, in turn, raises questions regarding the necessary scale of impact that must be demonstrated to enable a state court to constitutionally exercise jurisdiction.

This was one of the first court cases dealing with personal jurisdiction as it applied to use of the Internet. As a result, it set an influential precedent which later cases would reference in their reasons, including Zippo Manufacturing Co. v. Zippo Dot Com, Inc.

== See also ==
- Personal jurisdiction in Internet cases in the United States
- Personal jurisdiction
- Zippo Manufacturing Co. v. Zippo Dot Com, Inc.
- Cybersell, Inc. v. Cybersell, Inc.
