= CompuServe Information Manager =

Client software for the CompuServe service

WinCIM

CompuServe Information Manager (CIM) was CompuServe Information Service's client software, used with the company's Host-Micro Interface (HMI). The program provided a GUI front end to the text-based CompuServe service. Before CIM, CompuServe was largely accessed using either a standard terminal program or CompuServe's own NavCIS client program with alphanumerical shortcuts.

== History ==
In 1989, CompuServe switched parts of its service over to its new binary protocol, Host-Micro Interface (HMI). Unlike its predecessor, this new protocol was not usable directly via a telnet client thus requiring the use of specialised client software like CIM. Both CIM was issued at the same time as the GUI-only America Online began to grow in popularity. CIM was available for MS-DOS ("DOSCIM"), Microsoft Windows ("WinCIM"), Macintosh ("MacCIM"), and OS/2 ("CIM for OS/2") and allowed access to CompuServe's features, such as its forums, chat, e-mail, and messaging facilities; these continued to be accessible via standard communications software using alphanumeric shortcuts. The first versions were released in 1989. Although CIM soon overtook other client software as the de facto standard for CompuServe access, CompuServe still provided traditional terminal access to its service alongside HMI for power users and would continue to do so for many years.

Version 2.0.1, released in 1994, included a version of the Mosaic web browser. Version 3.0 (CompuServe for Windows 3.0), released in late 1996, was intended to compete head-on with AOL, and was released amid an advertising campaign in which CompuServe was briefly re-branded as "CSi".

After CompuServe was purchased by AOL in 1998, CompuServe began providing CompuServe branded versions of the AOL client software known as CompuServe 2000 and CompuServe 7.0 and its protocols as a way to access the service. However, it remained possible to connect to WinCIM via HMI, which became known as the "CompuServe Classic" service. CompuServe Classic was discontinued in 2009.

== Other CompuServe client programs ==
- TapCIS
- OzWin
- NavCIS
- ForCIS
- AutoSIG
