= Column Five =

American visual communication agency

- Type: Creative agency
- Industry: B2B tech, financial services, higher education, consumer goods and more
- Founded: 2009 in Orange County, California
- Founder: Ross Crooks, Josh Ritchie, and Jason Lankow
- Headquarters: Costa Mesa, California
- Services: Brand strategy; Content strategy; Content creation; Content distribution
- Website: https://columnfive.com

Column Five Media (often referred to as Column Five) is a B2B marketing agency that specializes in brand and content marketing for SaaS companies, as well as content marketing, branding, strategy, data visualization, and multimedia production services. The company ranked #291 on the Inc. 500 2013 list of the fastest-growing media companies in the U.S. The agency has also earned various accolades for its work, including awards from the Content Marketing Institute and Webby Awards, and is notable for creating and producing the viral video "Child of the 90s" on behalf of Internet Explorer. In 2023, Column Five also launched the Best Story Wins podcast, where they interview marketing industry leaders about how they build world-class brands.

== History ==
Column Five was founded by Ross Crooks, Josh Ritchie, and Jason Lankow in 2009 in Orange County, California. The company gained early recognition as pioneers in the infographic marketing space, creating infographic and data visualization designs for Bay Area startups, including Mint.com (acquired by Intuit) and publications such as Forbes and Time, before expanding its services into content marketing, branding, strategy, and multimedia production.

== Clients ==
Column Five has worked with a diverse range of clients, from startups to Fortune 500 companies, across various industries, including technology, finance, healthcare, and education. Notable clients include Instacart, Dropbox, Uber, Coinbase, JP Morgan Payments, SentinelOne, Netflix, Microsoft, Intuit, Metlife, and Roblox. Column Five has also worked with nonprofits such as Teach for America, International Rescue Committee, and Girls Who Code.

== Works ==
Column Five has received several industry accolades for excellence in design, storytelling, digital, and content marketing. One of Column Five's most notable projects is the "Child of the 90s" ad produced for Internet Explorer's "Browser You Loved to Hate" campaign. The viral video amassed 50 million views, ranked #3 on AdWeek's Top 10 Viral Ads of 2013, won a Gold award in the Best Film category for Ads of the World January 2013, and received nominations for both the Webby Awards and Mashie Awards. "Child of the 90s" also received significant media coverage in publications such as Time.

In 2019, Column Five's “Searching for Salai” podcast series for SAP won the Content Marketing Institute's Content Marketing Award for Best Podcast/Audio Series and Content Marketing Project of the Year. The project was selected from nearly 1,100 entries submitted to the 2019 Content Marketing Awards. Their work has also been featured in publications such as Forbes, Fast Company, and The Atlantic.

Column Five has been recognized by Built In as one of the top content marketing agencies to know, cited for its interdisciplinary approach spanning animation, white papers, and social media content.

=== Educational Contributions ===
In 2011, the co-founders were invited to teach the Visualization of Information graduate course on data design at Columbia University. In 2012, Crooks, Ritchie, and Lankow published the book Infographics: The Power of Visual Storytelling (published by Wiley). In 2023, they launched the Best Story Wins podcast, where they interview marketing industry experts and thought leaders about how they win customers’ hearts, minds, and marketshare. The founders also continue to conduct workshops, keynote presentations, and webinars to share content marketing strategies on data visualization and storytelling.

Awards and Recognition
Year	Awarded By	Client	Category	Ref.
2024	Anthem Awards	Mozilla	Bronze: Responsible Technology, Special Projects, and Awareness Categories	
2024	Collision Award	Mozilla	Gold: Marketing & Communications, Campaign Science & Technology; Silver: Marketing & Communications, Campaign Non-Profit	
2023	Telly Awards	Thorfi	Bronze: Non-Broadcast Craft-3D Graphics/Animation (Non-Stereoscopic); Silver: Non-Broadcast Craft-Use of 3D Animation; Silver: Non-Broadcast Craft-Fully Animated piece	
2020	Awwwards	VideoAmp	Honorable Mention	
2020	Webby Awards	Dialpad	Branded Entertainment, Scripted Video Honoree	
2019	Content Marketing Institute	SAP	Best Podcast/Audio Series, Content Marketing Project of the Year	
2018	One Show	Column Five	Merit Award	
2018	Applied Arts Magazine	Column Five	Artist/Design Firm Promotions - Series	
2017	Graphis	Column Five	Poster Annual — Silver Award (Promotion Category); Design Annual — Silver Award (Print Poster Categories)	
2016	One Show	Column Five	Merit Award	
2014	Awwwards	A24 Films	Honorable Mention	
2013	Webby Awards	Microsoft	Advertising, Media, & PR Viral Marketing Honoree	
