= Interrogation sequence =

Data sent by a system to request a response

In telecommunications, an interrogation sequence is a short sequence of data sent by one system in order to trigger a known response from another. An example is in radar system's identification friend or foe (IFF) signals, which send a short sequence of radio frequency pulses that trigger a known response from the aircraft's transponder, like its current altitude. Another use is with computer terminals and file transfer protocols that send out a sequence of bytes to enquire about the user's system and adjust the data it sends in response.
