= ScrapBook =

Extension for the Mozilla Firefox web browser

ScrapBook is an extension for the Mozilla Firefox web browser which adds enhanced scrapbooking, page saving, bookmarking, and notetaking functionality.

ScrapBook saves web pages in the local computer. However, it can be used in combination with a synchronization service so that the data is accessible from other devices.

As Firefox no longer supports legacy add-ons since version 57, the development of ScrapBook has been stopped and it is now referred as "legacy ScrapBook". It still works in a Firefox fork that supports the legacy XUL/XPCOM framework, such as Pale Moon and Waterfox. There are also successor browser extension projects that provides similar features in modern browsers, such as WebScrapBook and ScrapBee.

== Legacy projects ==
=== ScrapBook ===
ScrapBook was initially developed at Murota Laboratory, which is a member of the Chair of Human Resource Development in the Department of Human System Science at Graduate School of Decision Science and Technology, Tokyo Institute of Technology. It is currently maintained by Gomita.

ScrapBook won the "Most Useful Upgraded Extension" award in Mozilla's 2006 "Extend Firefox" competition.

=== ScrapBook X ===
The development of ScrapBook has been slow since around 2012, and many issues has remained unfixed. Several clones has been created, such as ScrapBook Plus, ScrapBook Plus 2 and ScrapBook Lite, but development of all of them has been discontinued.

Danny Lin took over and created ScrapBook X, which is built on the source code of its successors. It keeps mostly the architecture of ScrapBook, but has added new features and bug fixes. The project also added or took over several Firefox add-ons that extend the functionality of ScrapBook, such as:

- ScrapBook X MAF Creator, which converts the ScrapBook data items into MAFF format (open format enabling whole webpages to be saved in a single file [renaming the .maff extension in the .zip extension will make the archive accessible even by web browsers that do not support the .maff format]), which can be opened with Firefox's MAF add-on.
- ScrapBook X CopyPageInfo, which copies to clipboard the information of single or multiple ScrapBook data items with the possibility to format it in pre-defined or custom formats, which is useful for creating formatted bibliography references, for example in BibTeX.
- ScrapBook X AutoSave, which automatically captures webpages on browsing them.
- ScrapBook X File Converter, which converts other formats (.enex, .maff, .html+files_directory, .epub, .zip, etc.) into ScrapBook X export format or back, which can then be imported into ScrapBook or ScrapBook X. It also allows the backup of the whole ScrapBook or ScrapBook X data folder.

==== Analysis by Max Planck Institute ====
The Max Planck Institute for the History of Science has published an article about digital scrapbooking ("Digital Scrapbook – can we enable interlinked and recursive knowledge equilibrium?") where Scrapbook X is thoroughly analysed and discussed as an example of scrapbooking tool for scholars:

...The Scrapbook-X has been analysed in detail, with the aim to understand its potential, as it seemed to be the closest feature-related component with the Scrapbook paradigm, furthermore it is implemented as a Firefox browser plug-in i.e. it can be smoothly integrated in a web-based research and discovery of resources with a standard browser application....

The abstract of this article additionally describes what ScrapBook X does (and, to some extent, ScrapBook):

We investigate possible tools and approaches to develop a Digital Scrapbook, a virtual research environment inspired by the recursive nature of research for scholars where they can combine web and own resources into a new scholarly edition readily enabled for Open Access. Web resources are interlinked in the digital scrapbook by content capture and detail selection, rather than sole bookmark or link to resource URL, along with necessary accompanying metadata. We analyse several open source and commercial tools, with special focus on a Scrapbook-X Firefox Add-On, in order to match to desired Digital Scrapbook features. We further address the wider requirement context for development of such Digital Scrapbook environment, discussing both technical and user experience dimensions. We conclude with a recommendation on how to approach the development and operation of a Digital Scrapbook environment.

== Modern projects ==
=== WebScrapBook ===
WebScrapBook is the successor browser extension of ScrapBook X written in WebExtension and supports Firefox and Chromium-based browsers, and mobile browsers based on them. A collaborating backend server, which can be set up using the webscrapbook Python package (aka PyWebScrapBook), is required for several advanced functionalities such as organizing captures in the sidebar.

WebScrapBook supports most features of legacy ScrapBook X, and has improved and added several features introduced by modern browsers.

The data scheme of WebScrapBook has been changed to be more compatible with a modern web browser without a browser extension, an advanced browser configuration, or a local server. As a result, WebScrapBook data cannot be used interchangeably with legacy ScrapBook's. Nevertheless, PyWebScrapBook provides a CLI tool to migrate legacy ScrapBook data to WebScrapBook format. Conversion from WebScrapBook to ScrapBook is also available, but WebScrapBook new feature related information will lose permanently.

=== ScrapBee ===
ScrapBee is a WebExtension Firefox add-on (and works with a local backend server) that supports accessing legacy ScrapBook data. However, the data scheme has been changed slightly and thus data generated by ScrapBee cannot be accessed by legacy ScrapBook.

=== ScrapYard ===
ScrapYard is a WebExtension Firefox add-on that supports management of scrapbooks stored in the browser internal storage (IndexedDB). It also supports bookmark and cloud drives integration. Legacy ScrapBook data can be imported through a helper application.

== See also ==
- List of Firefox extensions
- Zotero – another application having similar functions
