= Standard work =

Standard work or standardized work is a lean manufacturing is the current, documented best known method for executing a task. The purpose is to create a consistent, efficient, and repeatable process that can be utilized by anyone enabling workers to reduce waste, improve quality, and increase productivity.

Employees may be resistant to the deployment of standard work due resistance to change.

Aside from creating stability, standardized work provides a baseline for kaizen or continuous improvement. Without a stable, repeatable process it is not possible to assess whether a change to a job has helped or hurt it.

There are three elements to standardized work:

1. Takt Time — the pace of customer demand
2. Standard Work in Process (SWIP) — the minimal amount of inventory required to ensure a smooth flow
3. Work Sequence — the steps to complete the job safely with quality within takt time

There are three standardized work sheets:

1. Standardized Work Chart —maps an operator's walk path to parts, tools, stations, and equipment, while documenting key points for safety and quality.
2. Standardized Work Process Capacity Sheet — calculates whether equipment can keep up with the pace of demand
3. Standardized Work Combination Table — records an operator's manual work alongside automated machine work, and walking to assess if a job can be completed within takt time.

Standard work is not the same as standard operating procedure. The latter details rules and technical requirements (e.g. a torque rating), while the former explains an operator's method and how he interacts with tools, equipment, and the product within takt time.
