= Structured Word Inquiry =

Pedagogical technique

Structured Word Inquiry (SWI) is a pedagogical technique that involves the scientific investigation of the spelling of words. SWI emphasizes the scientific exploration of word structure through morphology, etymology, related words, and phonology. The guiding principles of SWI are (1) "the primary function of English spelling is to represent meaning" and (2) "conventions by which English spelling represents meaning are so well-ordered and reliable that spelling can be investigated and understood through scientific inquiry."

== Research and Effectiveness ==
Extensive research has shown that morphology-based instruction, such as SWI, can significantly improve literacy skills. A systematic review of the literature, The Effects of Morphological Instruction on Literacy Skills (2010), found that teaching morphology helps students connect spelling, meaning, and pronunciation in ways that enhance reading and writing. Additionally, SWI has been found to align well with various literacy instruction models, including phonics-based systems, and strengthens students' understanding of English orthography by emphasizing the relationship between sounds, meanings, and word origins.

== Four Questions ==
SWI uses four guiding questions to investigate the spelling of a word:

1. What is the meaning of a word?
2. What are the morphemes of the word?
3. What are morphological and etymological relatives of the word?
4. What are the letters doing in the word (spelling phonemes, functioning as markers, or zeroed)?

The questions are designed to be explored sequentially, starting with understanding the meaning of the word. Investigating each question in this order helps to build a deeper, more systematic understanding of English spelling conventions.

== Word Sums and Word Matrices ==
SWI uses the concepts of "word sums" and "word matrices" as essential tools for analyzing word structure. A word sum shows how a word is constructed by combining morphemes. It is essential for testing hypotheses about the orthographic and morphological structure of words. For example, the word "design" can be broken down into "de" + "sign", and "designated" can be analyzed as "de" + "sign" + "ate" + "ed". A word matrix is a visual representation of the relationships between words that share common morphemes. It allows students to explore patterns of word formation and deepen their understanding of the morphological structure of related words.

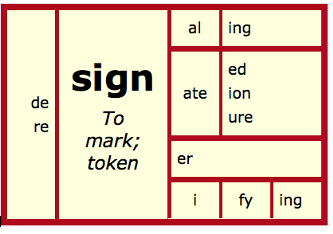
A word matrix showing some of the members of the <sign> word family

== Expanding the Application of SWI ==
SWI is gaining traction as a method for teaching students of varying ages, from young children to adults, by emphasizing the structure of words rather than rote memorization. It has been successfully integrated into literacy programs in various educational settings, particularly those focused on spelling and vocabulary development. For example, websites like Shameless Spelling offer extensive resources and case studies on how SWI can be implemented for a diverse range of learners, from struggling readers to those with special learning needs.

Additionally, the approach is supported by organizations like Teach a Student to Read, which advocate for SWI's effectiveness in fostering a deeper understanding of English spelling rules. These organizations provide comprehensive guides for educators on how to effectively apply SWI principles in the classroom to promote reading and writing success.

== Criticisms and limitations ==
While SWI has proven beneficial in many classrooms, some critics argue that it can be time-consuming and may require extensive teacher training to implement effectively. Additionally, the method's focus on morphological structures may be difficult for younger students or those with specific learning challenges to grasp initially. As with any pedagogical method, the success of SWI depends on how well it is tailored to individual learning contexts and the needs of students.
