= CompuServe =

1969–2009 American online service provider

CompuServe, Inc.

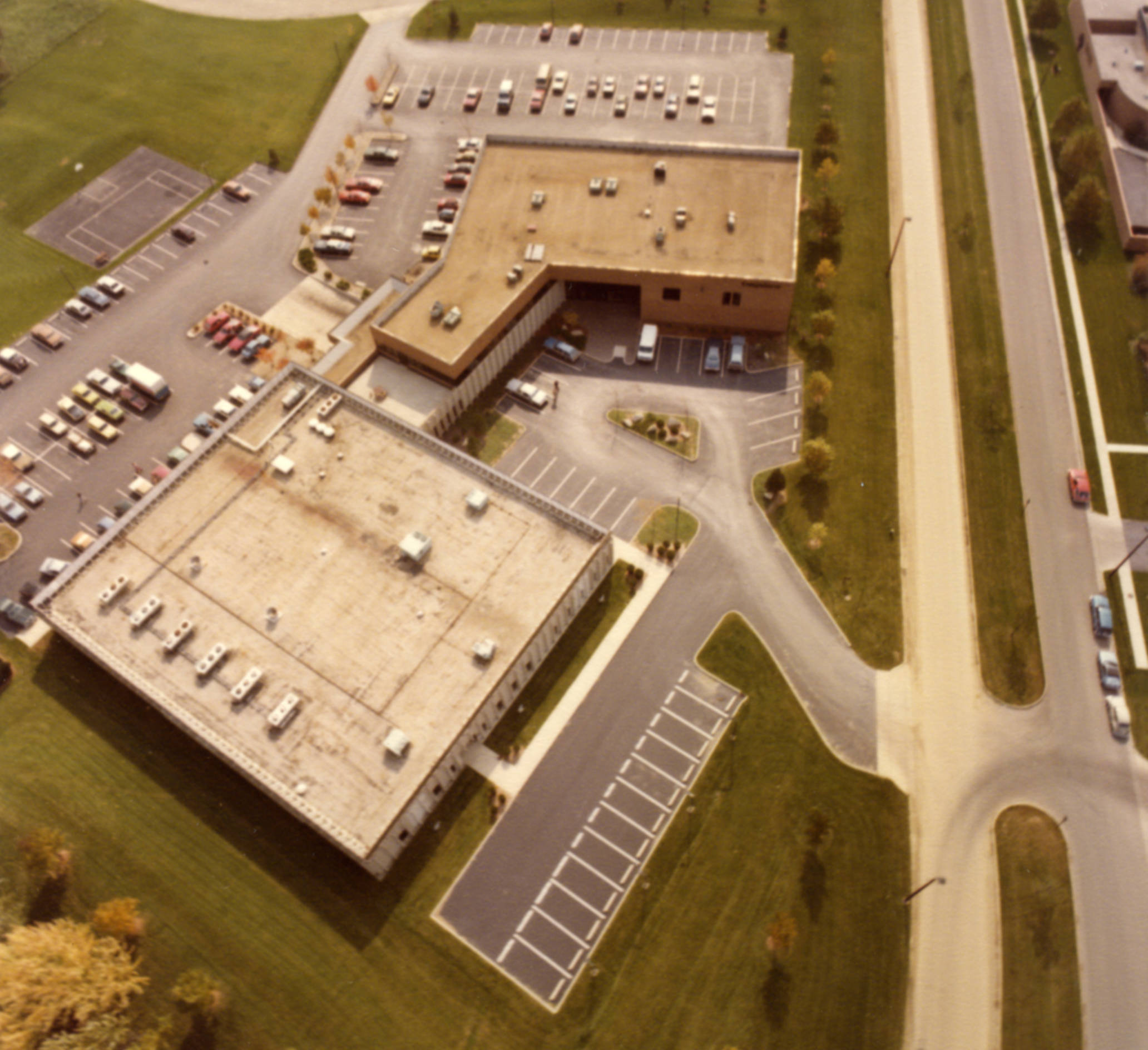
- Former corporate headquarters in Columbus, Ohio
- Type: Subsidiary
- Industry: Internet and communications
- Founded: 1969; 57 years ago (as Compu-Serv Network, Inc.)
- Defunct: July 1, 2009; 17 years ago
- Headquarters: Columbus, Ohio, U.S.
- Products: Online services, ISP
- Website: www.compuserve.com

CompuServe, Inc. (CompuServe Information Service, Inc., also known by its initialism CIS or later CSi) was an American Internet company that provided the first major commercial online service. It opened in 1969 in Columbus, Ohio, as a timesharing and remote access service marketed to corporations. After a successful 1979 venture selling otherwise under-utilized after-hours time to Radio Shack customers, the system was opened to the public, roughly the same time as The Source.

H&R Block bought the company in 1980 and began to advertise the service aggressively. CompuServe dominated the industry during the 1980s, buying their competitor The Source. One popular use of CompuServe during the 1980s was file exchange, particularly pictures. In 1985, it hosted one of the earliest online comics, Witches and Stitches. CompuServe introduced a simple black-and-white image format known as RLE (run-length encoding) to standardize the images so they could be shared among different types of microcomputers. With the introduction of more powerful machines enabling display of color, CompuServe introduced the much more capable Graphics Interchange Format (GIF), invented by Steve Wilhite. GIF later became the most common format for 8-bit images transmitted by Internet during the early and mid-1990s.

At its peak during the early 1990s, CIS had an online chat system, message forums for a variety of topics, extensive software libraries for most personal computers, and a series of popular online games, including MegaWars III and Island of Kesmai. In 1994, it was described as "the oldest of the Big Three information services (the others are Prodigy and America Online)". However, the rise of modern systems like AOL, as well as the open World Wide Web system, led to it losing marketshare. In 1997, a complex deal was devised with WorldCom acting as a broker, resulting in the company being sold to AOL. New products under the CompuServe sub-brand ceased in 2002, and the original CompuServe Information Service, later rebranded as CompuServe Classic, was eventually shut down in 2009 after 30 years.

== Company history and development of the service ==
=== Founding ===
CompuServe was initiated during 1969 as Compu-Serv Network, Inc. (Note: The earliest advertising shows the name with initial capitals.) in Columbus, Ohio, as a subsidiary of Golden United Life Insurance.

Though Golden United founder Harry Gard Sr.'s son-in-law Jeffrey Wilkins is widely miscredited as the first president of CompuServe, its first president was actually John R. Goltz. Wilkins replaced Goltz as CEO within the first year of operation. Goltz and Wilkins were both graduate students of electrical engineering at the University of Arizona. Other early recruits from the same university included Sandy Trevor (inventor of the CompuServe CB Simulator chat system), Doug Chinnock, and Larry Shelley.

The company's objectives were twofold: to provide in-house computer processing for Golden United Life Insurance; and to develop as an independent business in the computer time-sharing industry, by renting time on its PDP-10 midrange computers during business hours, mainly to other businesses. It was divested as a separate company during 1975, trading on the NASDAQ using the symbol CMPU.

Concurrently, the company recruited executives who changed the emphasis from offering time-sharing services, for which customers wrote their own applications, to a service providing application programs. The first of these new executives was Robert Tillson, who quit Service Bureau Corporation (then a subsidiary of Control Data Corporation, but originally formed as a division of IBM) to become CompuServe's Executive Vice President of Marketing. He then recruited Charles McCall (who succeeded Jeff Wilkins as CEO, and later became CEO of the medical information company HBO & Co.), Maury Cox (who became CEO after the departure of McCall), and Robert Massey (who succeeded Cox as CEO).

In 1977, CompuServe's board changed the company's name to CompuServe Incorporated. In 1979, it began "offering a dial-up online information service to consumers". In May 1980, at which time Compuserve had fewer than 1,000 subscribers to its consumer information service, H&R Block acquired the company for $25 million and within four years had grown its subscriber base to about 110,000.

=== Technology ===
The original 1969 dial-up technology was fairly simple—the local telephone number in Cleveland, for example, was a line connected to a time-division multiplexer that connected via a leased line to a matched multiplexer in Columbus that was connected to a time-sharing host system. In the earliest buildups, each line terminated at a single machine of CompuServe's host service, so that one dialed different telephone numbers to reach different computers.

Later, the central multiplexers in Columbus were replaced with PDP-8 minicomputers, and the PDP-8s were connected to a DEC PDP-15 minicomputer that acted as switches so a telephone number was not tied to a particular destination host. Finally, in 1977, CompuServe developed its own packet switching network, implemented by DEC PDP-11 minicomputers acting as network nodes that were installed throughout the United States (and later, in other countries) and interconnected. Over time, the CompuServe network evolved into a complicated multi-tiered network incorporating Asynchronous Transfer Mode (ATM), Frame Relay (FR), Internet Protocol (IP) and X.25 technologies.

In 1981, The Times explained CompuServe's technology in one sentence:

CompuServe is offering a video-text-like service permitting personal computer users to retrieve software from the mainframe computer over telephone lines.

The New York Times described them as "the most international of the Big Three" and noted that "it can be reached by a local phone call in more than 700 cities".

CompuServe was also a vendor of other commercial services. One of these was the Financial Services group, which collected and consolidated financial data from myriad data feeds, including CompuStat, Disclosure, I/B/E/S as well as the price and quote feeds from the major exchanges. CompuServe developed extensive screening and reporting programs that were used by many investment banks on Wall Street.

=== CIS ===
On September 24, 1979, Radio Shack began offering the residential information service MicroNET, in which home users accessed the computers during evening hours when the CompuServe computers were otherwise idle. This was a success and CompuServe began to advertise it more widely as "MicroNET, CompuServe's Personal Computing Division". Its success prompted CompuServe to disuse the MicroNET name in favor of its own, becoming CompuServe Information Service, or CIS, on July 1, 1980. CIS's 1979 origin was approximately concurrent with that of The Source. (Note: In 1989 CompuServe purchased and dismantled The Source.)

By the mid-1980s, CompuServe was one of the largest information and networking services companies, and it was the largest consumer information service. It operated commercial branches in more than 30 US cities, selling primarily network services to major corporations throughout the United States. Consumer accounts could be bought in most computer stores (a box with an instruction manual and a trial account login) and this service was well known to the public. By 1987, consumer business would provide 50% of CompuServe revenues.

The corporate culture was entrepreneurial, encouraging "skunkworks projects". Alexander "Sandy" Trevor secluded himself for a weekend, writing the "CB Simulator", a chat system that soon became one of CIS's most popular features. Instead of hiring employees to manage the forums, they contracted with systems operators (sysops), who received compensation based on the success of their own forum's boards, libraries, and chat areas.

=== Newspapers ===
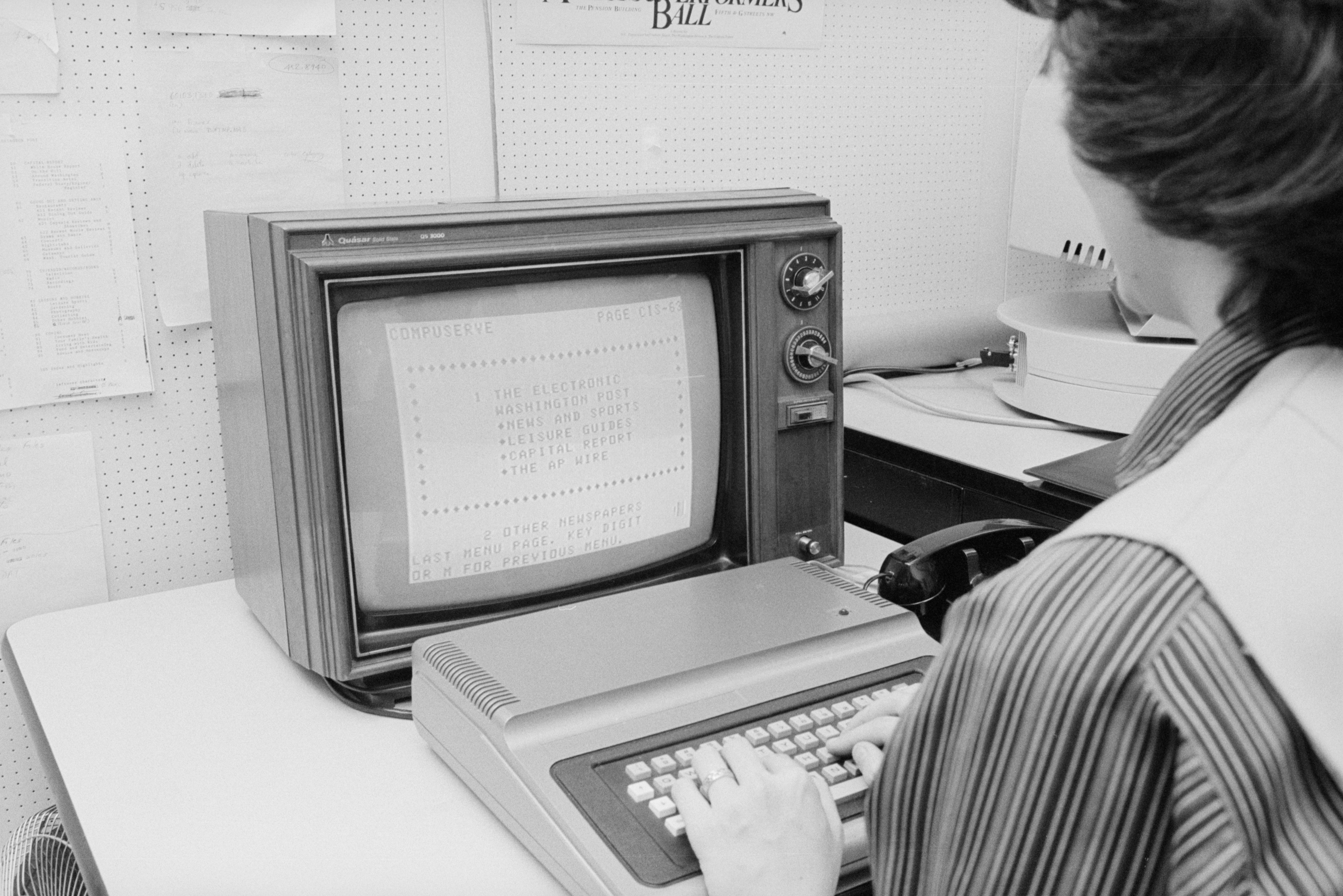
Woman at The Washington Post using CompuServe on a TRS-80 Color Computer in 1981

In July 1980, working with Associated Press, CompuServe began hosting a text version of the Columbus Dispatch. The New York Times, Virginian-Pilot and Ledger Star, The Washington Post, San Francisco Examiner, San Francisco Chronicle, and Los Angeles Times were added in 1981; additional newspapers followed.

Although accessing articles in these newspapers comprised 5% of CompuServe's traffic, reading an entire newspaper using this method was impractical; the text of a $0.20 print edition newspaper would take two to six hours to download at a cost of $5 per hour (after 6 p.m.).

=== Selling connectivity ===
Another major unit of CompuServe, the CompuServe Network Services, was formed in 1982 to generate revenue by selling connectivity to the nationwide packet network CompuServe had built to support its time-sharing service. CompuServe designed and manufactured its own network processors, based on the DEC PDP-11, and developed all the software that operated on the network. Often (and erroneously) termed an X.25 network, the CompuServe network implemented a mixture of standardized and proprietary layers throughout the network.

One of the proprietary layers was termed Adaptive Routing. The Adaptive Routing system implemented two powerful features. One is that the network operated entirely in a self-discovery mode. When a new switch was added to the network by connecting it to a neighbor via a leased telephone circuit, the new switch was discovered and absorbed into the network without explicit configuration. To change the network configuration, all that was needed was to add or remove connections, and the network would automatically reconfigure. The second feature implemented by Adaptive Routing was often discussed by network engineers, but was implemented only by CNS – establishing connection paths on the basis of real-time performance measurements. As one circuit became busy, traffic was diverted to alternative paths to prevent overloading and poor performance for users.

While the CNS network was not itself based on the X.25 protocol, the network presented a standard X.25 interface to customers, providing dial-up connectivity to corporate hosts, and allowing CompuServe to form alliances with private networks Tymnet and Telenet, among others. This gave CompuServe the largest selection of local dial-up telephone connections in the world, in an era when network usage charges were expensive, but still less than long-distance charges. Other networks permitted CompuServe access to still more locations, including international locations, usually with substantial connect-time surcharges. It was common during the early 1980s to pay a $30-per-hour charge to connect to CompuServe, which at the time cost $5 to $6 per hour before factoring in the connection-time surcharges. This resulted in the company's being nicknamed CompuSpend, Compu$erve or CI$.

CNS has been the primary supplier of dial-up communications for credit-card authorizations for more than 20 years, a competence developed as a result of its long-time relationship with Visa International. At the peak of this type of business, CompuServe transmitted millions of authorization transactions each month, representing several billion dollars of consumer purchase transactions. For many businesses an always-on connection was an extravagance, and a dial-up option made better sense. This service presently remains in operation, as part of Verizon (see below). There are no other competitors remaining in this market.

The company was notable for introducing a number of online services to personal computer users. CompuServe began offering electronic mail capabilities and technical support to commercial customers in 1978 using the name InfoPlex, and was also a pioneer of the real-time chat market with its CB Simulator service introduced on February 21, 1980, as the first public, commercial multi-user chat program. Introduced in 1985, EaasySABRE, a customer-accessible extension of the Sabre travel system, made it possible for individuals to find and book airline flights and hotel rooms without the help of a travel agent. CompuServe also introduced a number of online games.

=== File transfers ===
Around 1981, CompuServe introduced its CompuServe B protocol, a file-transfer protocol, allowing users to send files to each other. This was later expanded to the better-performance B+ version, intended for downloads from CIS itself. Although the B+ protocol was not widely supported by other software, it was used by default for some time by CIS itself. The B+ protocol was later extended to include the Host-Micro Interface (HMI), a mechanism for communicating commands and transaction requests to a server application operating on the mainframes. HMI could be used by "front end" client software to present a GUI-based interface to CIS, without having to use the error-prone CLI to route commands.

CompuServe began to expand its business operations outside the United States. It began in Japan in 1986 with Fujitsu and Nissho Iwai, and developed a Japanese-language version of CompuServe named NIFTY-Serve in 1989. In 1993, CompuServe Hong Kong was initiated as a joint venture with Hutchison Telecom and was able to acquire 50,000 customers before the dial-up ISP frenzy. Between 1994 and 1995 Fujitsu and CompuServe co-developed WorldsAway, an interactive virtual environment. As of 2014 the original virtual environment that began on CompuServe in 1995, known as the Dreamscape, was still operating.

During the late 1980s, it was possible to log on to CompuServe via worldwide X.25 packet switching networks, which bridged onto CompuServe's existing US-based network. It gradually introduced its own direct dial-up access network in many countries, a more economical solution. With its network expansion, CompuServe also extended the marketing of its commercial services, opening branches in London and Munich.

=== CCAC ===
CompuServe, and its outside telecommunications attorney, Randy May, directed appeals to the Federal Communications Commission (FCC) to exempt data networks from having to pay the common carrier access charge (CCAC) that was levied by the telephone local exchange carriers (primarily the Baby Bell companies) on long-distance carriers. The primary argument was that data networking was a new industry, and the country would be served better by not exposing this important new industry to the aberrations of the voice telephone economics (the CCAC is the mechanism used to subsidize the cost of local telephone service from long-distance revenue). The FCC agreed with CompuServe's argument, and the consequence is that all dial-up networking in the United States, whether using private networks or the public internet, is much less expensive than it otherwise would have been.

=== Internet ===
CompuServe was the first online service to offer Internet connectivity, albeit with limited access, as early as 1989, when it connected its proprietary e-mail service to allow incoming and outgoing messages to be exchanged with Internet-based e-mail addresses.

During the early 1990s, CompuServe had hundreds of thousands of users visiting its thousands of moderated forums, forerunners to the discussion sites of the World Wide Web. (Like the Web, many forums were managed by independent producers who then administered the forum and recruited moderators, termed sysops.) Among these were many in which computer hardware and software companies offered customer assistance. This broadened the audience from primarily business users to the technical "geek" crowd, some of whom had earlier used Byte Magazine's Bix online service.

There were special forums, special groups, but many had "relatively large premiums" (as did "some premium data bases" with charges of "$7.50 each time you enter a search request".)

In 1992, CompuServe hosted the first known WYSIWYG e-mail content and forum posts. Fonts, colors and emoticons were encoded into 7-bit text-based messages via the third-party product NavCIS for MS-DOS and Windows 3.1, and later, Windows 95. NavCIS included features for offline work, similar to offline readers used with bulletin board systems, allowing users to connect to the service and exchange new mail and forum content in a largely automated fashion. Once the "run" was complete, the user edited their messages locally while offline. The system also allowed interactive navigation of the system to support services like the chat system. Many of these services remained text based.

CompuServe later introduced CompuServe Information Manager (CIM) to compete more directly with AOL. Unlike Navigator, CIM was adapted for online work, and used a point-and-click interface very similar to AOLs. Later versions interacted with the hosts using the HMI communications protocol. For some types of service which were not compatible with HMI, the older text-based interface could be used. WinCIM also allowed caching of forum messages, news articles and e-mail, so that reading and posting could be performed offline, without incurring hourly connection costs. Previously, this was a luxury of the NavCIS, AutoSIG and TapCIS applications for power users.

CIS users could purchase services and software from other CompuServe members using their CompuServe account, something Internet users could not do until the NSFNET lifted the prohibition on commercial Internet use in 1989.

During the early 1990s, the hourly rate decreased from more than $10 per hour to $1.95 per hour. In March 1992, it began online signups with credit card based payments and a desktop application to connect online and check emails. In April 1995, CompuServe had more than three million members, still the largest online service provider, and began its NetLauncher service, providing WWW access capability via Spry, a Mosaic browser. AOL, however, introduced a much cheaper flat-rate, unlimited-time, advertisement-funded price plan in the US to compete with CompuServe's hourly charges. In conjunction with AOL's marketing campaigns, this caused a significant loss of customers until CompuServe responded with a similar plan of its own at $24.95 per month in late 1997.

As the World Wide Web grew in popularity with the general public, company after company terminated their once-busy CompuServe customer assistance forums to offer customer assistance to a larger audience directly through their own company websites, an activity which the CompuServe forums of the time could not address because they did not yet have universal WWW access.

In 1992, CompuServe acquired Mark Cuban's company, MicroSolutions, for $6 million.

AOL's entry into the PC market in 1991 marked the beginning of the end for CIS. AOL charged $2.95 an hour versus $5.00 an hour for CompuServe. AOL used a freely available graphical user interface-based client; CompuServe's wasn't free, and it only had a subset of the system's functionality. In response, CIS decreased its hourly rates on several occasions. Subsequently, AOL switched to a monthly subscription instead of hourly rates, so for active users AOL was much less expensive. By late 1994, CompuServe was offering "unlimited use of the standard services (including news, sports, weather) ... and limited electronic mail" (Note: The per-message fee for e-mail from outside CompuServe was 15 cents, even for spam.) for $8.95 per month – what The New York Times called "probably the best deal."

CIS's number of users grew, maximizing in April 1995 at 3 million worldwide. By this time AOL had more than 20 million users in the United States alone, but this was less than their maximum of 27 million, due to customers quitting for lesser-cost offerings. By 1997 the number of users quitting all online services for dial-up Internet service providers was reaching a climax.

In 1997, CompuServe began converting its forums from its proprietary Host-Micro Interface (HMI) to HTML web standards. The 1997 change discontinued text based access to the forums, but the forums were accessible both through the web as well as through CompuServe's proprietary HMI protocol. In 2004 CompuServe discontinued HMI and converted the forums to web access only. The forums remained active on CompuServe.com until the end of 2017.

=== Acquisitions ===
CompuServe made a number of acquisitions in its history, both before and after being acquired by H&R Block:

- Early 1970s – Alpha Systems of Dallas, Texas, a small regional timesharing company which was also based on PDP-10 technology. It was operated as a standalone company for a brief time, but later their PDP-10 was moved to CompuServe's Columbus, Ohio, datacenter and the Dallas operation ended.
- ~1986 – Software House – developer of System 1022, a relational database system.
- ~1986 – Collier-Jackson – developer of human resource management products.
- 1988 – Access Technology – developer of the 20/20 spreadsheet program.
- 1995 – Spry, Inc. – developer of Internet in a Box, the first consumer internet suite.

== Software and features ==
=== User IDs and e-mail addresses ===
The original CompuServe user identifiers consisted of seven octal digits in the form 7xxxx,xx – a legacy of PDP-10 architecture – (later eight and nine octal digits in the form 7xxxx,xxx and 7xxxx,xxxx and finally ten octal digits in the form 1xxxxx,xxxx) that were generated in advance and issued on printed "Snap Paks".

From 1989, CompuServe users had email access to the internet, using their user ID in the form xxxxx.xxxx@compuserve.com – where the comma in the original ID was replaced with a period. In 1996, users were allowed to create an alias for their internet e-mail address, which could also be used for a personal webpage; the longest-term members were allowed first choice of the new addresses. In 1998, users were offered the option of switching their mailbox to a newer system that provided POP3 access via the internet, so that any internet email program could be used. Current CompuServe email addresses look like XXXXXX@cs.com for users of the CompuServe 2000 service.

=== Custom portals ===
CompuServe has a long history offering a custom portal of the CompuServe Information Service to the airline industry. Beginning during the 1970s, CompuServe offered a customized version of its service that allowed pilots and flight attendants to bid for flight schedules with their airline. CompuServe offered customized products to other industries as well, including a service termed CompuServe for Lawyers; another was "the African-American Culture and Arts Forum."

As part of CompuServe 2000, another customized portal made a two-year deal with WebMD.

=== CompuServe GUIs ===
Over time, there were several graphical user interfaces developed for accessing CompuServe. Unlike what AOL gave for free, The New York Times wrote about them "which Compuserve ought to give away, but does not". Among their names were WinCIM, TapCIS and NavCIS.

At a time when subscribers paid for timed access (as well as long-distance calls in some countries) and had to spend time online reading and replying to messages, their goal was to bypass CompuServe's WinCim interface, and streamline sending all pre-written email and forum postings that the user had written offline, then receiving new messages, downloading requested files, and logging off CompuServe.

==== TapCIS ====
TapCIS (The Access Program for the Compuserve Information Service) (Note: sometimes referred to as TAPCIS) was an automated MS-DOS-based software application that sped up access to, and management of, CompuServe email accounts and forum memberships for PC users from 1981 until 2004 when advances in CompuServe technology rendered it obsolete. It was described as "archaic-looking (but) .. remains a powerful tool for accessing CompuServe forums."

TapCIS was written in Borland's Turbo Pascal code by Howard Benner, a marketing executive from Wilmington, Delaware, who joined CompuServe in 1981. The software, which was shareware and retailed at US$79, had a community of users who continued to maintain their own website.

Since it was able to issue administrative commands, TapCIS was the preferred program for dozens of CompuServe system operators (sysops).

==== CIM and WinCIM ====
Regarding WinCIM (and predecessor CIM), PC Magazine wrote that "They give you a broader view of what's available" and by using it "you can more easily navigate the service." They explicitly caution that, unlike TapCIS, it "won't save any money ... it could actually take you longer to retrieve and answer messages ... than without it."

==== OzCIS and OzWIN ====
Although OzCIS and OzWIN (its Windows-based successor) were described as "free for personal use" by PC Magazine, it was shareware, like WinCIM, TapCIS and NavCIS.

The programming was done by Steve Sneed using Pascal-like Delphi code; (Note: formerly a Borland product) the software was published by Ozarks West Software Inc.

Like TapCIS, it had sysop features such as moving and deleting messages, administering the file libraries, and "flagging" users (giving and denying sysop rights). Unlike other offline readers such as TapCIS and NavCIS, which added proprietary ways of formatting text (colors, fonts, attributes), OzWin always remained "plain text" and never displayed any custom styles.

In May 2005, CompuServe discontinued access to the OzCis and TapCIS forums on CompuServe.

==== AutoSIG ====
AutoSIG was free, unlike WinCIM, TapCIS, NavCIS and OzCIS/OzWIN.

==== VisCIS ====
Visual CompuServe, also known as VisCIS, was a demonstration concept of a VRML-based client by programmer John D. Gwinner which modelled the CompuServe interface into a 3D virtual environment. It was later redeveloped by Gwinner into VisMenu, a general-purpose VRML menuing system.

=== Software applications ===
==== FILe Generator and Editor (FILGE) ====
FILe Generator and Editor (FILGE) was a command-oriented text editor created by CompuServe in the early 1970s. Later it was replaced by screen-oriented WYSIWYG editors. FILGE's commands were preceded by a forward slash (/) character.

For example, if a text file contained the line The quick brown fox jumps over the lazy dog, the word 'fox' could be replaced with word 'wolf' using the command:

/c/fox/wolf

To see the result of the edit, the user could type:

/p

and in this case, would see The quick brown wolf jumps over the lazy dog

There were many other commands, including a repeating capability later, which allowed significant file manipulations without the need to write special programs.

== Market share ==
Long the largest online service provider, by 1987 CompuServe had 380,000 subscribers, compared to 320,000 at the Dow Jones News/Retrieval, 80,000 at The Source, and 70,000 at GEnie.

CompuServe had three million users worldwide at its peak, compared to AOL's 27 million. By early 1999, many home users had switched to standard dial-up Internet access, and CompuServe had decreased to two million users, most of which were business or professional users".

== Legal cases ==
In 1991, CompuServe was sued for defamation in one of the early cases testing the application of traditional law to the internet in Cubby v. CompuServe. Although defamatory content was posted on one of its forums, CompuServe was not liable for this content because it was unaware of the content and did not exercise editorial control of the forum.

A November 1993 copyright infringement lawsuit regarding about 900 songs was settled two years later, with payment to be divided among publishers of the songs.

In 1995, CompuServe blocked access to sex-oriented newsgroups after being pressured by Bavarian prosecutors. In 1997, after CompuServe reopened the newsfeeds, Felix Somm, the former managing director for CompuServe Germany, was charged with violating German child pornography laws because of the material CompuServe's network was transmitting into Germany. He was first convicted in November 1997, and after another hearing sentenced to two years' probation on May 28, 1998. He was acquitted on appeal on November 17, 1999.

=== See also ===
- CompuServe Inc. v. Cyber Promotions, Inc.
- CompuServe, Inc. v. Patterson

== WOW! service ==
The WOW! logo

Wow! (styled WOW!) was an unlimited-access flat-rate online service operated by CompuServe, starting March 1996; its closure was announced by November of the same year, to be effective at the end of January 1997.

Several class-action lawsuits were filed, claiming that WOW! was sold to stockholders with false and misleading information. Wow! was supposed to make the company competitive with AOL – "a proprietary service aimed at families and novice computer users." The Wow! Information Service, announced in late 1995, was supposed to commence with Microsoft Windows 95 SR2, the first to include Internet Explorer. Knowing that bundling their browser would be considered anti-competitive, Microsoft also planned to bundle installers for several major ISPs into Windows, but CompuServe's software was not ready.

=== Wow.com domain ===
AOL retained the domain name wow.com after it acquired CompuServe, and kept it dormant from the shut-down of Wow! until 2007. In mid-2007, AOL considered transferring its Digg-style news aggregator, then hosted at Netscape.com, to wow.com, before ultimately transferring it to Propeller.com. Toward the end of the year, AOL was reportedly working on using the domain for a social networking service concerning the popular online role-playing game World of Warcraft.

From October 2010 until its 2015 shut-down, some of that was transferred to a subdomain of Joystiq. The domain wow.com was used simultaneously as a deal of the day site similar to Groupon. However, that site was also short-lived, shutting down in late 2011.

As of January 2019, wow.com is a search engine powered by Bing, using the same back-end as AOL Search, which is now part of Oath Inc.

== AOL acquisition and post–1997 history ==
Post–WorldCom-acquisition logo of CompuServe

The competition for customers between AOL and CompuServe became one of customers transferring back and forth, using free hours and other enticements. There were technical problems—the thousands of new generation USRobotics dial-up modems deployed in the network would crash during high call volumes. For the first time in decades, CompuServe began losing money, and at a prodigious rate. An effort, code-named "Red-Dog", was initiated to convert CompuServe's long-time PDP-10 based technologies to servers based on Intel x86 architectures and the Microsoft operating system Windows NT.

Parent company H&R Block was going through its own management changes at the same time, beginning with the retirement of CEO Henry Bloch. A series of successors ensued. In 1997, H&R Block announced its intention to divest itself of CompuServe. A number of potential buyers came to the forefront, but the terms they offered were unacceptable to management. AOL, the most likely buyer, made several offers to purchase CompuServe using AOL stock, but H&R Block management sought cash, or at least a better quality stock.

In February 1998, John W. Sidgmore, then vice chairman of WorldCom, and the former CEO of UUNET, devised a complex transaction which was ultimately satisfactory to all parties. Step one was that WorldCom purchased all the shares of CompuServe with $1.2 billion of WCOM stock. The next day, WorldCom sold the CompuServe Information Service portion of the company to AOL, retaining the CompuServe Network Services portion. AOL sold its networking division, Advanced Network Services (ANS), to WorldCom. Sidgmore said at this time that the world was in balance: the accountants were doing taxes, AOL was doing information services, and WorldCom was doing networks.

WorldCom's newly acquired CompuServe Network Services was renamed WorldCom Advanced Networks, and continued to operate as a discrete company within WorldCom after being combined with AOL's network subsidiary, ANS, and an existing WorldCom networking company named Gridnet. In 1999, Worldcom acquired MCI and became MCI WorldCom, WorldCom Advanced Networks briefly became MCI WorldCom Advanced Networks. MCI WorldCom Advanced Networks was ultimately absorbed into UUNET. Soon thereafter, WorldCom began its spiral to bankruptcy, re-emerging as MCI.

CompuServe was changed to the version "CompuServe 7.0." in 2001. In September 2003 CompuServe Information Service, which had become a division of AOL, added CompuServe Basic to its product lines, selling via Netscape.com.

=== 2006–present ===
In 2006, MCI was sold to Verizon. As a result, the organization that had once been the networking business within CompuServe is now part of Verizon Business.

In January 2007, CompuServe e-mailed members that Windows Vista was not supported, and suggested switching to the AOL-branded service. Like many older programs, however, CompuServe client software can operate with Windows Vista in compatibility mode.

While dividing CompuServe into its two major businesses, CompuServe Information Services and CompuServe Network Services, WorldCom and AOL both desired to make use of the CompuServe name and trademarks. Consequently, a jointly owned holding company was formed for no other purpose than to possess title to various trademarks, patents and other intellectual property, and to license that intellectual property at no cost to both WorldCom (now Verizon) and AOL.

CIS was then the value market-provider for several million customers, as part of the AOL Web Products Group. Recent U.S. versions of the CompuServe client software—essentially an enhanced Web browser—used the Gecko layout engine (developed for Mozilla) within a derivative of the AOL client and using the AOL dial-up network. The previous CompuServe service offering, re-branded as "CompuServe Classic", remained available in the US and also in other countries where CompuServe 2000 was not offered.

CompuServe announced on April 15, 2009, that CompuServe Classic would "no longer operate as an Internet Service Provider" and would terminate on June 30, 2009. All CompuServe Classic services, including OurWorld Web pages, were taken offline as of that date. CompuServe Classic e-mail users would be able to continue using their CompuServe e-mail addresses via a new e-mail system.

In 2015, when Verizon acquired AOL, all of CompuServe's original properties became parts of Verizon. CompuServe announced in November 2017 that the CompuServe Forums would be closed on December 15, 2017. Verizon then spun off AOL's parent Verizon Media (before 2019, Oath) as Yahoo! in 2021. AOL was then sold to Bending Spoons in late 2025.

AOL used the CompuServe brand for CompuServe 2000 (a rebranded low-cost offering), which ended in 2011 (including Mac), and CompuServe Dialer (a low-cost dial-up ISP that became a Web portal).

As of 2024, Compuserve.com serves a rebranded version of the Netscape Internet Service Web portal.

== International operations ==
Before the widespread use of the Internet and World Wide Web, the United Kingdom's first national major-brands online shopping service was developed by the UK subsidiary of CompuServe/CIS as part of its proprietary closed-system collection of consumer services. Andrew Gray initiated CompuServe UK's operations as the European subsidiary of the US company during the late 1980s and later became the company's European general manager, while David Gilroy was CompuServe's UK director of customer services. The service continued to grow and offered technical assistance managed by Suzanne Gautier and sales managed by Colin Campbell.

The service was proposed by Paul Stanfield, an independent business-to-consumer electronic commerce consultant, to Martin Turner, Product Marketing Director for CIS UK, in August 1994. Turner agreed and the project started in September with rapid market research, product development and sales of online space to major UK retail and catalogue companies. These included WH Smith, Tesco, Virgin/Our Price, Great Universal Stores/GUS, Interflora, Dixons Retail, Past Times, PC World (retailer) and Innovations.

The service began on Thursday April 27, 1995, with Paul Stanfield's purchase of a book from the WH Smith shop. This was a repeat of the first formal test of the service on February 9, 1995, which included secure payment and subsequent fulfilment of the order by Royal Mail postal delivery. Interactive Media in Retail Group (IMRG), the UK's industry association for e-retailing, believes that the UK's first national shopping service secure online transaction was the purchase of a WH Smith book from the CompuServe facility.

Approximately 1,000,000 UK customers had access to the shops at that time and it was British retailers' first major exposure to the medium. Other retailers joined the service soon after and included Sainsbury's Wine and Jaguar Cars (branded lifestyle goods). CompuServe UK commissioned writer Sue Schofield to produce a 'retail' pack including a new UK CompuServe Book and a free CD-ROM containing the CIS software to access the service.

CompuServe, with its closed private network system, was slow to react to the rapid development of the open World Wide Web and it was not long before major UK retailers started to develop their own websites independently of CompuServe.

In Germany, CompuServe 2000 was introduced in 1999 and withdrawn in 2001 because of market failure, but CompuServe Classic service remained for a while. CompuServe Germany introduced its own products for dial-up and DSL internet access, and its own client software (termed CompuServe 4.5 light).

In July 2007, CompuServe Pacific announced cessation as of August 31, 2007. In September 2007, it was announced that CompuServe France would end its operations on November 30, 2007. In the Pacific region (Australia, New Zealand, etc.) Fujitsu Australia operated the CompuServe Pacific franchise. In July 2008, CompuServe Germany informed its customers that it would end its operations on July 31, 2008. Its legacy service "CompuServe Classic" would not be affected by this decision.

== See also ==
- CompuServe, Inc. v. Patterson, a case involving Patterson's software, which came first, and a "similar" offering from CompuServe
- VIDTEX
