= Comparison of download managers =

This comparison contains download managers, and also file sharing applications that can be used as download managers (using the http, https and ftp-protocol). For pure file sharing applications see the Comparison of file sharing applications.

== General information ==
| Manager | Platform | Latest release | | License | Cost | CLI | GUI | Notes |
| Manager | Platform | Version | Date | License | Cost | CLI | GUI | Notes |
|---|---|---|---|---|---|---|---|---|
| BitComet | macOS | 2.10 | 2024-10-09 | Proprietary | No cost | Partial | Yes | (Note: Adware from version 0.85 to 0.97; Potentially sensitive information reported to BC Servers.) |
| BitComet | Windows | 2.10 | 2024-10-09 | Proprietary | No cost | Partial | Yes | (Note: Adware from version 0.85 to 0.97; Potentially sensitive information reported to BC Servers.) |
| Download Accelerator Plus | macOS | 10.0.6.0 | 2014-07-21 | Proprietary | Depends | ? | Yes | |
| Download Accelerator Plus | Windows | 10.0.6.0 | 2014-07-21 | Proprietary | Depends | ? | Yes | |
| DownloadStudio | Windows | 10.0.4.0 | 2017-12-21 | Proprietary | At cost | Yes | Yes | |
| DownloadStudio | Web | 10.0.4.0 | 2017-12-21 | Proprietary | At cost | Yes | Yes | |
| DownThemAll! | GNU/Linux | 4.15.1 | 2026-05-27 | GPL-2.0-only | No cost | No | Yes | |
| DownThemAll! | macOS | 4.15.1 | 2026-05-27 | GPL-2.0-only | No cost | No | Yes | |
| DownThemAll! | Windows | 4.15.1 | 2026-05-27 | GPL-2.0-only | No cost | No | Yes | |
| DownThemAll! | Web | 4.15.1 | 2026-05-27 | GPL-2.0-only | No cost | No | Yes | |
| FlashGet | Windows | 3.7.0.1220 | 2013-05-17 | Proprietary | No cost | No | Yes | |
| FlashGet | Web | 3.7.0.1220 | 2013-05-17 | Proprietary | No cost | No | Yes | |
| Free Download Manager | GNU/Linux | 6.30.3.6518 | 2025-10-31 | Proprietary | No cost (Note: No cost after version 5.0.) | No | Yes | |
| Free Download Manager | macOS | 6.30.3.6518 | 2025-10-31 | Proprietary | No cost | No | Yes | |
| Free Download Manager | Windows | 6.30.3.6518 | 2025-10-31 | Proprietary | No cost | No | Yes | |
| Free Studio | GNU/Linux | 6.7.7.1110 | 2022-11 | Proprietary | No cost | No | Yes | |
| Free Studio | macOS | 6.7.7.1110 | 2022-11 | Proprietary | No cost | No | Yes | |
| Free Studio | Windows | 6.7.7.1110 | 2022-11 | Proprietary | No cost | No | Yes | |
| Freemake Video Downloader | Windows | 5.0.0.17 | 2025-10-17 | Proprietary | No cost | No | Yes | (Note: Offers to install sponsored software upon installation changing default search engine and browsers homepage.) |
| GetRight | Windows | 6.5 | 2011-01-24 | Proprietary | At cost (Note: $49.95 for Pro) | Yes | Yes | |
| GetRight | Web | 6.5 | 2011-01-24 | Proprietary | At cost | Yes | Yes | |
| Go!Zilla | macOS | 5.02 | 2008-03-05 | Proprietary | At cost | No | Yes | (Note: No adware as of Version 5; Aureate adware prior to that.) |
| Go!Zilla | Windows | 5.02 | 2008-03-05 | Proprietary | At cost | No | Yes | (Note: No adware as of Version 5; Aureate adware prior to that.) |
| Go!Zilla | Web | 5.02 | 2008-03-05 | Proprietary | At cost | No | Yes | (Note: No adware as of Version 5; Aureate adware prior to that.) |
| Internet Download Manager | Windows | 6.42 Build 40 | 2025-05-30 | Proprietary | At cost (Note: $24.95 lifetime for 1 PC.) | Yes | Yes | |
| JDownloader | GNU/Linux | 2.0 | 2016-05-26 | GPL | No cost | Yes | Yes | (Note: Version 2: Adware comes bundled but can install even when not ticking yes.) (Note: Version 0.9: Adware Mobogenie (optional install); Adware browser hijacker Mysearchdial (optional install).) |
| JDownloader | macOS | 2.0 | 2016-05-26 | GPL | No cost | Yes | Yes | (Note: Version 2: Adware comes bundled but can install even when not ticking yes.) (Note: Version 0.9: Adware Mobogenie (optional install); Adware browser hijacker Mysearchdial (optional install).) |
| JDownloader | Windows | 2.0 | 2016-05-26 | GPL | No cost | Yes | Yes | (Note: Version 2: Adware comes bundled but can install even when not ticking yes.) (Note: Version 0.9: Adware Mobogenie (optional install); Adware browser hijacker Mysearchdial (optional install).) |
| JDownloader | Web | 2.0 | 2016-05-26 | GPL | No cost | Yes | Yes | (Note: Version 2: Adware comes bundled but can install even when not ticking yes.) (Note: Version 0.9: Adware Mobogenie (optional install); Adware browser hijacker Mysearchdial (optional install).) |
| Jigdo | FreeBSD | 0.8.2 | 2023-08-03 | GPL-2.0-only | No cost | Yes | No | |
| Jigdo | GNU/Linux | 0.8.2 | 2023-08-03 | GPL-2.0-only | No cost | Yes | No | |
| Jigdo | macOS | 0.8.2 | 2023-08-03 | GPL-2.0-only | No cost | Yes | No | |
| Jigdo | Solaris | 0.8.2 | 2023-08-03 | GPL-2.0-only | No cost | Yes | No | |
| Jigdo | Windows | 0.8.2 | 2023-08-03 | GPL-2.0-only | No cost | Yes | No | |
| KGet | GNU/Linux | | | GPL-2.0-or-later | No cost | Yes | Yes | (Note: Part of "KDE for Mac" and "KDE for Windows".) |
| KGet | macOS | | | GPL-2.0-or-later | No cost | Yes | Yes | (Note: Part of "KDE for Mac" and "KDE for Windows".) |
| KGet | Windows | | | GPL-2.0-or-later | No cost | Yes | Yes | (Note: Part of "KDE for Mac" and "KDE for Windows".) |
| Microsoft Download Manager | Windows | | | Proprietary | No cost | No | Yes | |
| MiniDM | Windows | 2.5.1 | 2010-06-02 | Proprietary | No cost | No | Yes | |
| MLDonkey | GNU/Linux | 3.2.1 | 2024-08-20 | GPL-2.0-or-later | No cost | Yes | Yes | |
| MLDonkey | Windows | 3.2.1 | 2024-08-20 | GPL-2.0-or-later | No cost | Yes | Yes | |
| MLDonkey | Web | 3.2.1 | 2024-08-20 | GPL-2.0-or-later | No cost | Yes | Yes | |
| Shareaza | Windows | 2.7.10.2 | 2017-09-18 | GPL-2.0-or-later | No cost | Yes | Yes | |
| Shareaza | Web | 2.7.10.2 | 2017-09-18 | GPL-2.0-or-later | No cost | Yes | Yes | |
| NexDM | Windows | 1.1.3 | 2026-08-26 | Proprietary | No cost | No | Yes | Multi-threaded turbo engine and media stream extraction. |
| Manager | Platform | Latest release | | License | Cost | CLI | GUI | Notes |
| Manager | Platform | Version | Date | License | Cost | CLI | GUI | Notes |

== Protocol support ==
| Manager | HTTP | HTTPS | FTP | SFTP | MMS | RTSP | Metalink | Magnet link | Podcast | RTMP | BitTorrent | eDonkey |
|---|---|---|---|---|---|---|---|---|---|---|---|---|
| BitComet | Yes | Yes | Yes | ? | ? | ? | ? | Yes | ? | ? | Yes | Yes |
| Download Accelerator Plus | Yes | Yes | Yes | ? | ? | ? | ? | ? | ? | ? | ? | ? |
| DownloadStudio | ? | ? | ? | ? | ? | ? | ? | ? | ? | ? | ? | ? |
| DownThemAll! | Yes | Yes | Yes | No | No | No | Yes | No | No | No | No | No |
| FlashGet | Yes | Maybe | Yes | No | Yes | Yes | Yes | Yes | No | Yes | Yes | Yes |
| Free Download Manager | Yes | Yes | Yes | No | Yes | Yes | No | Yes | No | No | Yes | No |
| Freemake Video Downloader | Yes | Yes | No | No | No | No | No | No | No | No | No | No |
| Free Studio | Yes | Yes | No | No | No | No | No | No | No | Yes | No | No |
| GetRight | Yes | Maybe (Note: Paid version only.) | Yes | No | No | No | Yes | ? | Yes | No | Yes | No |
| Go!Zilla | ? | ? | ? | ? | ? | ? | ? | ? | ? | ? | ? | ? |
| Internet Download Manager | Yes | Yes | Yes | No | Yes | No | No | No | No | Yes | No | No |
| JDownloader | Yes | Yes | Yes | No | No | No | Yes | No | Yes | No | No | No |
| Jigdo | Yes | Yes | Yes | No | No | No | No | No | No | No | No | No |
| KGet | Yes | Yes | Yes | Yes | Yes | No | Yes | ? | No | No | Yes | No |
| Microsoft Download Manager | Yes | Yes | ? | ? | ? | ? | ? | ? | ? | ? | ? | ? |
| MiniDM | Yes | Yes | Yes | No | No | No | No | No | No | No | No | No |
| MLDonkey | Yes | ? | Yes | ? | No | No | No | ? | No | No | Yes | Yes |
| Shareaza | Yes | Yes | Yes | Yes | No | No | No | Yes | No | No | Yes | Yes |
| NexDM | Yes | Yes | Yes | No | No | No | No | Yes | No | Yes | Yes | No |
| Manager | HTTP | HTTPS | FTP | SFTP | MMS | RTSP | Metalink | Magnet link | Podcast | RTMP | BitTorrent | eDonkey |

== Features ==
| Manager | Web browser integration | Resuming | Download acceleration | URLs per file | Mirror search | Auto dial/hangup | Categorized downloads | Cookies import | Speed limit | File browser | ZIP preview | Add-on support | Scheduler | Checksum verification | Remote Access/Control | Modified Timestamp preserved |
|---|---|---|---|---|---|---|---|---|---|---|---|---|---|---|---|---|
| BitComet | Yes | Yes | Yes | ? | Yes | ? | Yes | ? | Yes | ? | Yes | Yes | Yes | Yes | Yes | Yes |
| Download Accelerator Plus | Yes | Yes | Yes | ? | ? | ? | ? | ? | ? | ? | ? | ? | ? | ? | ? | ? |
| DownloadStudio | Yes | Yes | Yes | 1 | No | Yes | Yes | Yes | Yes | Yes | Yes | Yes | ? | No | ? | ? |
| DownThemAll! | Yes | Yes | Yes | 10 | Beta | No | Yes | No | Beta | No | No | No | No | Yes | No | Yes |
| FlashGet | Yes | Yes | Yes | unknown limit | Yes | Yes | Yes | Yes | All downloads | Yes | No | Yes | —N/a | No | No | ? |
| Free Download Manager | Yes | Yes | Yes | 10 | Yes | Yes | Yes | No | Yes | Yes | Yes | Yes | Yes | Yes | Yes | Yes |
| Free Studio | Yes | Yes | Yes | unlimited | No | No | No | No | No | No | No | No | No | No | No | ? |
| Freemake Video Downloader | No | Yes | Yes | unlimited | No | No | No | No | Yes | Yes | No | No | No | No | No | ? |
| GetRight | Yes | Yes | Partial (Note: 10 streams, needs mirrors for >4 streams.) | unlimited | Yes | Yes | Yes | Yes | Yes | Yes | Yes | Scripting | Yes | Yes | Yes | Yes |
| Go!Zilla | ? | ? | ? | ? | ? | ? | ? | ? | ? | ? | ? | ? | ? | ? | ? | ? |
| Internet Download Manager | Yes | Yes | Yes | 1 refreshable | No | Yes | Yes | Yes | Yes | Yes | No | No | Yes | Yes | No | Yes |
| JDownloader | Yes | Yes | Yes | 1 | No | Yes | No | No | Yes | No | No | Yes | Yes | Yes | Yes | ? |
| Jigdo | No | Yes | ? | unlimited | ? | No | No | No | No | No | No | ? | No | Yes | No | No |
| KGet | Yes (Note: Konqueror, Fx (via Flashgot plugin).) | Yes | Yes | unlimited | Yes | Yes | Yes | Yes | BitTorrent Only | Yes | No | Yes | ? | Yes | Yes | ? |
| Microsoft Download Manager | Yes | Yes | Yes | ? | No | No | No | No | No | No | No | No | No | No | No | ? |
| MiniDM | Yes | Yes | Yes | unlimited | No | No | No | No | No | Yes | No | Yes | ? | Yes | Yes | ? |
| MLDonkey | Partial | Yes | No | unlimited | No | No | Yes | No | Yes | No | No | Yes | ? | Yes | Yes | ? |
| Shareaza | Yes (Note: IE; Fx and similar: ext. plugin.) | Yes | Yes | unlimited | Yes | via Scheduler | Yes | No | Yes | Yes | Yes | Yes | ? | Yes | Yes | ? |
| NexDM | Yes | Yes | Yes | 64 | No | No | Yes | Yes | Yes | Yes | No | Yes | Yes | Yes | No | Yes |
| Manager | Web browser integration | Resuming | Download acceleration | URLs per file | Mirror search | Auto dial/hangup | Categorized downloads | Cookies import | Speed limit | File browser | ZIP preview | Add-on support | Scheduler | Checksum verification | Remote Access/Control | Modified Timestamp preserved |

== See also ==
- Comparison of BitTorrent clients
- Comparison of file-sharing applications
- BitLocker
