= IE7Pro =

- Stable release: 2.5.1 / June 2, 2010
- Operating system: Microsoft Windows
- Type: Browser extension
- Website: Unmaintained

IE7Pro is an add-on for Internet Explorer 6, 7, and 8 that aims to enhance the feature set provided by the browser. IE7Pro adds features such as tab enhancement, an ad blocker and flash blocker, mouse gestures, inline search, privacy enhancements, online bookmark service, Greasemonkey-like user script support, and plug-in support. IE7Pro is available in several languages – this is made possible by user translations.

The support of the product was discontinued after the release of minor version 2.4.7 before Internet Explorer 8 was fully supported. The support of the product was continued again and a new version, IE7Pro 2.5.1 was released on June 2, 2010. However, the website's forum link and the Help & FAQ link are both dead. As of the latest version, 2.5.1, there are still some minor incompatibility issues with IE8 (the IE7Pro icon does not display in the status bar and the flash blocker does not work).

== Overview ==
IE7Pro modifies Internet Explorer's default tab management features to add several options like double-clicking to close the tab, undo closing tabs, enable Super Drag n Drop where dragging a link and dropping it anywhere else on the page opens it on a new tab or dragging and dropping any selected chunk of text opens the results of searching it via the default search engine. IE7Pro also adds an ad blocker that uses a blacklist of sites to block ads in web pages. It can also block ads delivered as rich media such as flash movies. It also allows crash recovery, which lets a browsing session be restored in case the browser crashed. The contents of a tab can be saved as an image as well.

Mouse gesture support is also added by IE7Pro. It ships with a set of predefined gestures which can be customized later. IE7Pro adds support for UserJS and Greasemonkey-like scripts, which are site-specific JavaScript code that adds certain functionality to websites, or modifies the behavior of certain aspects of sites to make it compatible with the browser. It also includes a proxy switcher and a word-wheeled in-page search bar, which overrides Internet Explorer's search bar, like the search functionality in Firefox and the InlineSearch add-in for IE. Version 0.9.18 also added a spell checker.

IE7Pro's EasyHomepage in Internet Explorer 7

IE7Pro adds a button in the status bar which notifies the status of whether proxies are being used, and provides access to the configuration interface, and certain other functionality. Since version 1.0, it also adds a feature it calls EasyHomepage, which is similar to 'Speed Dial Browsing' in Opera 9 shows thumbnail renderings of 9 web sites in a grid, which can be visually identified and opened. Easy Homepage is largely developed by user FremyCompany who regularly updates the EasyHomepage.

== Modules ==
IE7Pro is developed in a componentized and modular fashion. Each feature has its own 'module'. Modules can be enabled or disabled, allowing for using to use only the feature they want. IE7Pro contains the following modules:

Basic Functions - Contains the core functions of IE7Pro.

Ad Blocker - Blocks all forms of advertising, including Flash ads, rich media, fly-ins, slide-ins, pop-ups, pop-unders, spyware and adware ads, and messenger ads.

Scripts & Plugins - The basic framework for userscripts and plugins. One of the most popular userscripts allows users to download videos from YouTube.

Spell Checker - IE7Pro Spell Check is an Internet Explorer extension that can perform spelling checks on all text inside Internet Explorer user-input forms. IE7Pro Spell Check will check any text you enter and alert you to possible errors by adding a red underline to any potentially misspelled words. It uses OpenOffice.org dictionaries.

Auto Form Filter - Works similar to Roboform and automatically fills in forms and passwords.

Mini Download Manager - Serves as a lightweight download manager. Unlike other download managers, Mini Download Manager is intended to be lightweight, and does not include as many features as traditional download managers. Mini Download Manager was developed by the developers of IE7Pro and Orbit Download Manager. It features the pausing and resuming of downloads, new task support multi links, drag and drop, HTTPS support library auto download button, directory selection, displaying the download status, the deletion of download history and downloaded files, and the saving of files using the timestamp from servers.

Privacy Cleaner - Can be configured to automatically clear browser history, temporary internet files, cookies, and more each time the user closes the browser.

Online Service - Software + Services feature, allows users to have their bookmarks uploaded into the cloud. Automatically syncs bookmarks each time the browser is closed.

Find bar - Works very similar to Firefox's search feature. Allows users to search the current web page for a word or phrase. A search pane is placed at the bottom of the Internet Explorer window. Pressing CTRL+F displays this search pane if it closed, usurping the shortcut keys for Internet Explorer's default search. The Find on this Page... option in Internet Explorer's Edit menu still launches the browser's default Find window. "Find as you type" functionality actively searches for words or portions of a word as you type in the search box. Match Case feature allows users to search for words or phrases in a case sensitive manner. Optional Highlight All feature locates every instance of your search string and highlights it in yellow. Buttons on the search pane lets users jump to the previous or next instance of your search string on the current web page. F3 or the Enter key also advances to the next occurrence of your search string. SHIFT+F3 or SHIFT+Enter also jumps to the previous occurrence of the search string.

FasterIE - Increases surfing speed by using prefetching.

Only run one IE process - Limits Windows to only allow one Internet Explorer process at a time, thus the name of the module.

Other features of IE7Pro include mouse gestures, super drag and drop, saving web pages, crash recovery, and a text saver.

== Name change ==
The developers stated that IE7Pro would have its name changed to IEPro (in order to avoid confusion that IE7Pro can only be used on IE7) and that they may buy a new domain for this purpose. However, this seems unlikely now due to the abandoned status of the product.

== Market reception ==
IE7Pro has been said to attempt to close the gap between older versions of Internet Explorer and new versions of Opera and Firefox, with it being one of the recommended downloads in many freeware download sites such as Brothersoft. Sandi Hardmeier, a Microsoft MVP specializing in Internet Explorer and Internet Security, recommends the add-on as one of the top five add-ons to download for Internet Explorer.

== Reviews ==
- Rosenblatt, Seth (November 7, 2008). "IE7Pro: CNET Editors' review". CNET. "Highly recommended."
- Orgera, Scott. "IE7pro Internet Explorer Add-on Review About.com Rating 5 Star Rating". About.com Guide: About Web Browsers. About.com. Archived from the original on 11 May 2013. "This is definitely the type of add-on that, once you've used it for a week, you will never know how you lived without it."
- Bass, Steve. "At a Glance: IE7Pro". PC World. "If you want a smart, free add-on for Internet Explorer, download IE7Pro."
- Winder, Davey (14 March 2007). "IE7pro review". PC Pro. "IE7pro is another free add-on that attempts to address the gap between Internet Explorer and Firefox. With an emphasis on ease of use, security and customisation, it does a pretty good job."
- Cassia, Fernando (24 July 2008). "IE7Pro turns Windows' browser into a Firefox copycat". The Inquirer. Archived from the original on July 24, 2009. "Basically what it does is replace every IE add-on you can imagine, and brings the same functionality as several Firefox extensions. It also brings something very similar to Greasemonkey user scripts to modify web pages in the browser, basically allowing one to "extend" web sites with functionality beyond what webmasters intended."
- Pash, Adam (20 March 2007). "Download of the Day: IE7Pro (Windows)". Lifehacker. "IE7Pro's crash recovery alone is worth the download (I don't know how I lived without session saving in Firefox)."
