= Freemake =

Freemake is a software brand by Ellora Assets Corporation. It can refer to:

- Freemake Audio Converter
- Freemake Music Box
- Freemake Video Converter
- Freemake Video Downloader
