= GetRight =

Download manager for Windows

- GetRight 6.3e in Windows XP
- Original author: Michael Burford
- Developer: Headlight Software
- Initial release: February 1997; 28 years ago
- Stable release: 6.5 / 24 January 2011
- Operating system: Windows 9x, Windows 2000, Windows XP, Windows Vista, Windows 7
- Size: 4.9 MB
- Available in: 10 languages
- Type: Download manager
- License: Shareware
- Website: getright.com

GetRight is a shareware download manager developed by Michael Burford. Burford's company, Headlight Software, first published the program in 1997. At the time of its release, one of GetRight's defining features was its ability to resume an interrupted download.

== Download manager ==
GetRight is able to pause and resume downloads, download from multiple servers to speed up download time (segmented file transfer), scheduling the starting and stopping of downloads and shutting off the computer or disconnecting the modem when the downloads have finished. It is also able to integrate with Microsoft's Internet Explorer, and Mozilla Firefox with the FlashGot extension. It features support for the BitTorrent protocol, Metalink, and podcast support, along with built-in verification MD5 and SHA-1 checksums. During the 2000s especially it was a well-known download manager.

== License modes ==
Version 6 is available in two license modes: Standard and Pro. "Standard" is the continuation of previous versions, while "Pro" contains new features like: upload capability, using scripts for programming its tasks, a simple web server (called "Web Access"), ability to act as a proxy server or work in a Client/Server mode when using two or more computers in a network.
