= Audio converter =

Device or software that converts an audio signal from one format to another

An audio converter is software or electronic circuitry (hardware) that converts audio from one format to another. It is typically used to translate audio into a different format that is required by a device or program. Audio converters are employed in a variety of applications, including personal entertainment systems, professional audio production, telecommunications, and security systems.

In general, any particular audio format is categorized as either analog, uncompressed or compressed digital. Conversions between analog and raw audio are performed by hardware. More specifically, an analog-to-digital converter is used when converting analog to raw, and a digital-to-analog converter is used to convert uncompressed digital to analog audio. Uncompressed or compressed digital audio may be converted to another digital format either by software or a hardware accelerator.

== Types of audio converters ==
=== Software converters ===
Software converters are applications that run on computers or mobile devices. They offer a user-friendly interface and a wide range of supported input and output formats. Popular software audio converters include Audacity, Freemake Audio Converter, and dBpoweramp.

==== Online converters ====
Web-based converters allow users to upload audio files to a website, which then processes and converts the files before providing a download link. This approach is convenient for users who prefer not to install additional software. Online converters often support common formats like MP3, WAV, and FLAC.

=== Hardware converters ===
Dedicated hardware devices, such as digital audio converters (DACs) and audio interfaces, can convert audio signals from analog to digital or vice versa. These devices are often used in professional audio settings, such as recording studios, to maintain high-quality audio signal integrity.

== Common audio formats ==
=== Raw ===
WAV (Waveform Audio Format): An uncompressed format that preserves the original audio quality but generates larger files.

=== Compressed ===
MP3 (MPEG-1 Audio Layer III): A widely used compressed format known for its balance of quality and file size.

M4A (MPEG-4 Audio): A compressed format often used with Apple devices, similar to MP3 but potentially offering higher quality at the same bitrate.

FLAC (Free Lossless Audio Codec): A lossless compression format that maintains the original audio quality but creates files larger than MP3s.

OGG Vorbis: An open-source, lossless compression format gaining popularity for its quality and compatibility.

An audio transcoder converts from one compressed audio format to another (e.g., MP3 to AAC) by means of two audio codecs: One for decoding (uncompressing) the source and one for encoding (compressing) the destination file or stream.

== List of audio converters ==
=== Software ===
- Audacity
- FFmpeg
- Freemake Audio Converter
- VLC media player — while primarily media player software, VLC can also be used to convert audio files.

== See also ==
- Transcoding
- Audio file format
- Comparison of audio coding formats
- List of audio conversion software
