= Orbit Downloader =

Download manager and malware application for Windows

- Screenshot of Orbit Downloader version 2
- Developer: Innoshock
- Release: 8 November 2006; 19 years ago
- Final release: 4.1.1.19 / 17 January 2014
- Operating system: Microsoft Windows
- Platform: IA-32
- Type: Malware (originally download manager)
- License: Malware (originally adware)
- Website: orbitdownloader.com (Now Online Downloader)

Orbit Downloader is a discontinued download manager for Microsoft Windows. Launched in 2006, its developers abandoned it in 2009. In 2013, Orbit Downloader was classified as malware by antivirus software after ESET discovered a botnet in the application.

== Features ==
One of the main features of the program is its ability to grab and download embedded Flash Video files from online video platforms. Orbit Downloader also accelerates downloads by acting as a peer-to-peer client, utilizing bandwidth of other users.

Orbit Downloader supports downloading from HTTP, HTTPS, FTP, Metalink, RTSP, MMS and RTMP protocols. Orbit Downloader supports Internet Explorer, Maxthon, Mozilla Firefox and Opera web browsers.

== Funding and malicious conduct ==
Although Orbit Downloader is free, it is an advertising-supported product since it offers to change the web browser's homepage upon installation and also offers to install software that are not critical for its operation. Also it has begun to display built-in ads inside the program main window and when a dialog of a finished download appears.

On 21 August 2013, the WeLiveSecurity blog, published by the ESET security company, reported that since version 4.1.1.15, Orbit Downloader includes a botnet-like module which performs DDoS attacks without the user's knowledge or permission. Because of this dubious behavior, it is being detected as malware. Following this report, BetaNews, Download.com, DownloadCrew, MajorGeeks, Softpedia and Softonic removed app download link from their websites. Betanews attempted to contact Innoshock but discovered that the developer's last blog activity had been in 2009 and the Orbit community forum has since been left to a spammer.

== See also ==
- Comparison of download managers
- Real Time Messaging Protocol
