= Go!Zilla =

Download manager

- Developer(s): Headlight Software
- Stable release: 5.02 / 5 March 2008
- Operating system: Windows
- Platform: PC
- Type: Download Manager
- License: Shareware
- Website: gozilla.com

Go!Zilla was a proprietary download manager originally developed by Aaron Ostler in 1995, and later purchased by Radiate in 1999, for use on Windows. It is shareware and its previous ad supported version drew controversy among users and privacy advocates. Upon being acquired by Headlight Software in 2008, the ad-supported versions were discontinued and the software now offers a free limited trial. The URL is not currently associated with the company as of 2025.

Go!Zilla was one of many download managers, also called download accelerators. These particular programs were especially useful when dial-up internet access was more common as it was more difficult to download data due to slow speeds and disconnections. Download accelerators allowed users to stop and resume partial downloads. The software also allowed people to schedule downloads for a convenient time; including while they were away from the computer and was credited with allowing companies to provide a parallel distribution system for their products. In July 2000 the software won PC Magazine's ZDNet's Seventh Annual Shareware Award for Best Utility and was estimated to be used by ten million people at that time.

In January 2008, Go!Zilla was acquired by Headlight Software, and Go!Zilla 5 was the first version released with all new source code and without the bundled adware, which had caused some controversy despite notifying users that adware was bundled.

== See also ==
- Download accelerator
- Comparison of download managers
