= Fedora Unity =

Fedora Unity is a community project to build comprehensive and concise websites and content that provide Fedora users and contributors with quality information.

All submissions to the project are covered by the Open Publication License (with no options) unless otherwise noted in order to allow submission to the Fedora Documentation Project.

== Re-spins ==
The Fedora Unity project produces ISO images for i386 and x86_64 architectures that are available as Jigdo downloads, containing slipstreamed installation media.

Last release: Fedora 12 Re-spins-20100303 released, March 19, 2010. These Re-Spin ISOs are based on the officially released Fedora 12 installation media and include all updates released as of March 3, 2010.

== See also ==
- List of remastering software
