= Grabit =

Grabit or GrabIt may refer to:

- GrabIt, a news reader program for Windows
- Grab-it, or Grab It, a brand of cookware
- Grabit (browser extension), a port for FlashGot
