= List of augmented browsing software =

Augmented Browsing Software
Name	Form	Features	Compatibility	Last Updated
bookmarklets	JavaScript	Can execute arbitrary JavaScript on any page, but requires a user to click them, rather than running automatically	Firefox, Chromium browser, and Safari	Builtin
Firebug	Firefox extension for developers	Allows arbitrary real time changes to a page's DOM	Firefox	2017
Greasemonkey	Browser extension	Open source userscript manager. Alters the output of web content immediately after being displayed.	Firefox, Firefox for Android	2026
ScriptCat	Browser extension	Open source userscript manager compatible with Greasemonkey/Tampermonkey-style scripts; supports background scripts, scheduled scripts, and cloud sync	Firefox, Firefox for Android, and Chrome	2026
Tampermonkey	Browser extension	Closed source userscript manager that provides features including an overview over the running scripts, a built-in editor, ZIP-based import and export, automatic update checks, and browser- and cloud storage-based synchronization	Chrome, Edge, Firefox, Opera, Safari	2025
Tweeks	Browser extension	Creates site-specific modifications and functions as a userscript manager compatible with Greasemonkey/Tampermonkey-style scripts; extends the scripting API with capabilities including email sending and on-page Generative AI inference	Firefox and Chromium browser	2026
iMacros	Browser extension	Allows the user to record and replay "Internet Macros" for web automation, web scraping, or web testing.	Firefox, Chromium browser, and Internet Explorer	2018
Proxomitron	Proxy-level language	Available since late 1990s, predates JavaScript active browsing and provides a similar function for all browsers using a regular expression-like matching language		2003
Stylish	Firefox extension using Cascading Style Sheets	Client-side manipulation of webpage content	Firefox	2022
Violentmonkey	Browser extension	Open source userscript manager	Edge, Firefox, Firefox for Android, Opera	2026
Userscripts	Browser extension	Supports writing Userscripts (JavaScript) and Userstyles (CSS)	Safari	2024
