= Super C =

Super C may refer to:

- Super C (freight train), a high-speed train operated by the Atchison, Topeka and Santa Fe Railway, U.S.
- Super C (supermarket), a Canadian grocery store chain
- Super C class ferry, built in Germany for BC Ferries, British Columbia, Canada
- Super C Season, a 2011 album by Nigerian rap artist, Naeto C
- SUPER ©, software used to convert (encode) or play multimedia files
- A version of the video game Super Contra that was ported to Nintendo Entertainment System
- A character developed by American singer Ciara and used to promote her album Fantasy Ride
- A junior ice hockey trophy in Ontario, Canada; see Clarence Schmalz Cup
- SuperC (Aachen), a central service building at the RWTH Aachen in Germany
