= Tim Exile =

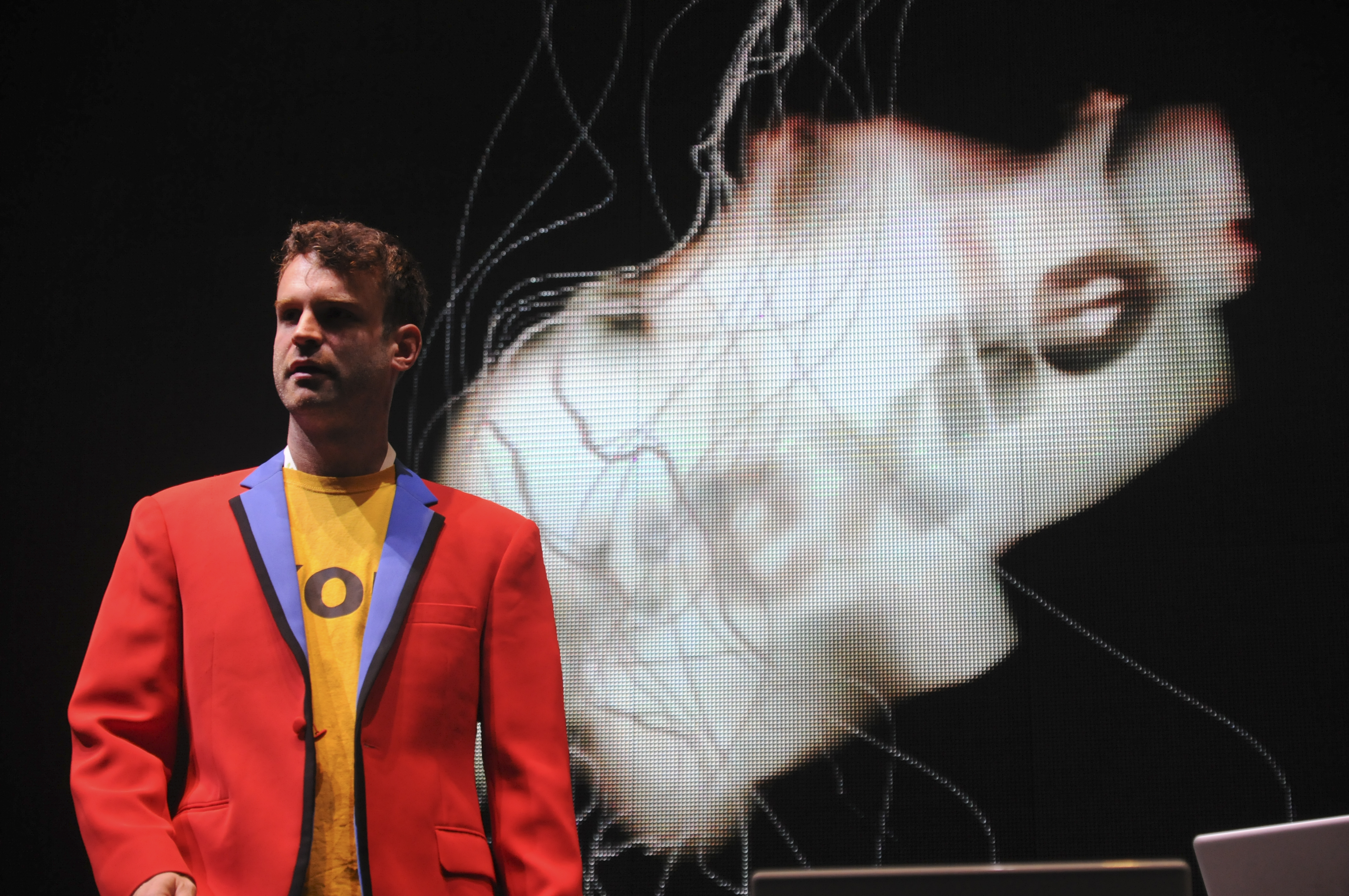
- Exile performing live at Campus Party Mexico, 2011

Background information
- Born: Timothy Charles Shaw
- Origin: United Kingdom
- Genres: Electronic; IDM
- Occupations: Music producer, DJ, software developer
- Years active: 1999–present
- Labels: Planet Mu, Beta Recordings, Warp

Tim Exile (or Exile) is the recording alias of Timothy Charles Shaw, a English electronic musician and software developer whose work spans drum and bass, IDM, breakcore and gabber.

== Early life ==
Exile was educated at Rendcomb College from 1990 to 1997 and studied philosophy at Durham University, where he wrote his dissertation on the difference between music and noise. He then completed a Master of Arts within the Durham University Department of Music, graduating in 2002.

== History ==
A classically trained violinist, he began experimenting with electronic music aged 12, and gained his first drum and bass release in 1999. In the following years he released mostly for the legendary Moving Shadow imprint, and John B's Beta Recordings, having met John B at Durham. After the completion of his philosophy degree, he went on to study an MA in electroacoustic composition at Durham. Perhaps unsurprisingly, his drum and bass grew increasingly experimental, and his debut LP (Pro Agonist, 2005) was released by Mike Paradinas' Planet Mu label, more commonly associated with the IDM scene.

Unsatisfied with the possibilities of conventional DJing, Exile programmed his own performance tools (at first using Pure Data and running into difficulties, he then switched to Reaktor) to allow improvisational live sets, which led to official work for Native Instruments.

In 2009 he contributed a cover of a Jamie Lidell song to the Warp20 (Recreated) compilation. He also toured the US in late 2009 supporting and collaborating live with Imogen Heap.

In 2012, at Sonar Festival in Barcelona, he teamed up with Jamie Lidell, DJ Shiftee, Mr. Jimmy and Jeremy Ellis to form Mostly Robot, a new collaborative project.

In 2016, he launched Endlesss, a collaborative music-making app inspired by his Flow Machine, which he had previously used in live performances. A desktop version of Endlesss was released in 2020. Endlesss closed in 2024. Following the closure, the platform's website announced that the application was "now in the care of HabLab London", a creative technology company founded by Imogen Heap, which was working to restore the core service.

In July 2023, it was discovered that he had developed a tumor in relation to an unspecified bladder cancer that would then be removed in August of the same year; however, the tumor was apparently larger than expected when removed. The surgery was completed with no complications, though more treatment was expected to occur throughout 2023.

== Discography ==
- Hanzo Steel Cuts EP (Mosquito, 2004)
- Pro Agonist (Planet Mu, 2005) (as Exile)
- Tim Exile's Nuisance Gabbaret Lounge (Planet Mu, 2006)
- Listening Tree (Warp, 2009)
- Harmuni EP (Leisure System, 2013)
