= Microsoft Download Manager =

Computer program

- Developer: Microsoft
- Initial release: 2011; 15 years ago
- Operating system: Windows 7, Server 2008 R2, Vista, XP (SP3)
- Size: 1.3 MB
- Available in: Multilingual
- Type: Download manager
- License: Proprietary
- Website: Official Webpage

Microsoft Download Manager was a simple download manager for Windows that was published by Microsoft in 2011. It supports downloading files over HTTP and HTTPS and is usable in multiple languages. A Softpedia reviewer criticized the program, noting missing features compared to other download managers.
