= FlashGot =

- Developer: InformAction
- Stable release: 1.5.6.14 / December 1, 2016; 9 years ago
- Platform: Mozilla Firefox
- Available in: 43 languages
- List of languages Afrikaans, Albanian, Arabic, Belarusian, Bulgarian, Catalan, Chinese Simplified, Chinese Traditional, Croatian, Czech, Dutch, English, Estonian, French, Finnish, Galician, German, Greek, Hebrew, Hungarian, Indonesian, Italian, Japanese, Kazakh, Korean, Lithuanian, Macedonian, Malay, Norwegian Bokmål, Persian, Polish, Portuguese, Brazilian Portuguese, Romanian, Russian, Serbian, Slovak, Slovenian, Spanish, Swedish, Thai, Turkish, Ukraininan
- Type: Firefox add-on
- License: GPLv2
- Website: flashgot.net

FlashGot was an add-on for Firefox that allowed interoperability between the Firefox browser and external download managers. It is no longer compatible with later versions of Firefox. It is not itself a download manager but is designed to allow the Firefox interface to be extended to connect to the selected external download manager. This avoided launching the download manager as an independent application and cutting and pasting the across the links of the files that need to be downloaded. Forked browsers like Pale Moon and Waterfox are also supported.

== Software ==
A download manager is an app specialized in downloading files from the Internet faster and in a more organized manner. However, not all these apps integrate with Mozilla Firefox. The FlashGot add-in resolves this situation by integrating the download managers into Firefox allowing interoperability. As of December 2011, FlashGot recognizes and supports 51 different external download managers. When a user chooses to download one or more files, FlashGot offers to send them to the detected download manager. Additionally, FlashGot can detect video embedded in web pages and send their download links to download managers. It supports downloading from the popular YouTube service. It also contain powerful extended media download functions.

Mozilla broke compatibility with Flashgot (and many other add-ons) in version 56, so it works only on older Mozilla versions.

FlashGot supports metalinks for sending mirror and checksum information to supported download managers for faster and more reliable downloads.

Version 1.2.1.13 included an experimental "Search Refinements for downloadable files and media" feature based on Surf Canyon technology. This functionality, which submitted search keywords to Surf Canyon for processing, was easy to opt out of with one click but enabled by default, prompting criticism equating the feature to adware and spyware, even though no user data was reused, shared or stored. The feature was disabled in version 1.2.1.14 and removed in version 1.2.1.15.

The last version of FlashGot was released in December 2016 and is not compatible with Firefox 57 or later versions. FlashGot is free software, as it is released under the GPLv2 open source license.

== Reception ==
In March 2006, PC World included FlashGot in its list of "101 Fabulous Freebies" and regards it as "indispensable". It was ranked as 16th most popular Firefox plugin in Computer Bild. FlashGot was reviewed by download.com, TechAdvisor Softpedia, TomsGuide.com and Softonic.

== Ports ==
=== Grabit ===
Grabit is a port of FlashGot for Pale Moon.

== See also ==
- NoScript – from the same author
