= Comparison of video converters =

Comparison list

Video converters are computer programs that can change the storage format of digital video. They may recompress the video to another format in a process called transcoding, or may simply change the container format without changing the video format. The disadvantages of transcoding are that there is quality loss when transcoding between lossy compression formats, and that the process is highly CPU-intensive.

This article compares video converters that have their own articles on Wikipedia.

== Overview ==
Video converter	Developer	License	Supported platform		
Video converter	Developer	License	Windows	Mac OS X	Linux
Any Video Converter	Anvsoft Inc.	Freeware	Yes	Yes	No
Avidemux	Mean, Gruntster, Fahr	GPL-2.0-or-later	Yes	Yes	Yes
Dr. DivX	DivX, Inc.	Adware bundled 15-day trial	Yes	Yes	No
DVDVideoSoft Free Studio	DVDVideoSoft	Shareware (requires paid membership for basic operation)	Yes	No	No
FFmpeg	FFmpeg project	LGPL-2.1-or-later and GPL-2.0-or-later	Yes	Yes	Yes
FormatFactory	Chen Jun Hao	Freeware (ad supported)	Yes	No	No
Freemake Video Converter	Freemake	Freeware (ad supported, requires payment to remove watermark)	Yes	No	No
HandBrake	Handbrake Project	GPL-2.0-only	Yes	Yes	Yes
MediaCoder	Stanley Huang	Freeware (ad supported)	Yes	No	No
MEncoder	The MPlayer Project	GPL-2.0-or-later	Yes	Yes	Yes
OggConvert	Tristan Brindle	LGPL-2.1-or-later	Experimental	No	Yes
SUPER	eRightSoft	Freeware (ad supported)	Yes	No	No
VirtualDub	Avery Lee	GPL-2.0-or-later	Yes	No	No
MiniTool Video Converter	MiniTool® Software Limited	Freeware	Yes	No	No

== Input ==
Supported input container formats
Video converter	3GP	AVI	Blu-ray video	DVD video	FLV	Matroska	MP4	MPEG-PS	Ogg	QuickTime	SVCD	TS	TOD	VCD	WMV
Any Video Converter	Yes	Yes	Yes	Yes	Yes	Yes	Yes	Yes	Yes	Yes	Yes	Yes	Yes	Yes	Yes
Avidemux	Yes	Yes	No	Yes	Yes	Yes	Yes	Yes	Yes	Yes	Yes	Yes	Yes	Yes	Yes
FFmpeg	Yes	Yes	No	Yes	Yes	Yes	Yes	Yes	Yes	Yes	Yes	Yes	Yes	Yes	Yes
Freemake Video Converter	Yes	Yes	No	Yes	Yes	Yes	Yes	Yes	Yes	Yes	Yes	Yes	Yes	Yes	Yes
FormatFactory	Yes	Yes	Yes	Yes	Yes	Yes	Yes	Yes	Yes	Yes	Yes	Yes	Yes	Yes	Yes
DVDVideoSoft Free Studio	Yes	Yes	Yes	Yes	Yes	Yes	Yes	Yes	Yes	Yes	Yes	Yes	Yes	Yes	Yes
HandBrake	Yes	Yes	Yes	Yes	Yes	Yes	Yes	Yes	Yes	Yes	Yes	Yes	Yes	Yes	Yes
Prism Video Converter	Yes	Yes	No	No	Yes	Yes	Yes	Yes	Yes	Yes	No	Yes	Yes	No	Yes
SUPER	Yes	Yes	Yes	Yes	Yes	Yes	Yes	Yes	Yes	Yes	Yes	Yes	Yes	Yes	Yes
MiniTool Video Converter	Yes	Yes	No	No	Yes	No	Yes	Yes	Yes	No	No	Yes	No	No	Yes

== Output ==
Supported output container formats
Video converter	3GP	AVI	Blu-ray video	DVD video	FLV	Matroska	MP4	MPEG-PS	Ogg	QuickTime	Super Video CD	TS	TOD	Video CD	Webm	WMV
Any Video Converter	Yes	Yes	No	Yes	Yes	Yes	Yes	Yes	Yes	Yes	?	?	?	?	Yes	Yes
Avidemux	Yes	Yes	Yes	Yes	Yes	Yes	Yes	Yes	Yes	Yes	Yes	Yes	?	Yes	Yes	No
FFmpeg	Yes	Yes	Yes	Yes	Yes	Yes	Yes	Yes	Yes	Yes	Yes	Yes	?	Yes	Yes	Yes
FormatFactory	Yes	Yes	No	Yes	Yes	Yes	Yes	Yes	No	Yes	No	No	No	No	No	Yes
DVDVideoSoft Free Studio	Yes	Yes	Yes	Yes	Yes	Yes	Yes	Yes	Yes	Yes	Yes	No	No	Yes	Yes	Yes
Freemake Video Converter	Yes	Yes	Yes	Yes	Yes	Yes	Yes	Yes	?	No	?	?	?	?	No	Yes
HandBrake	No	No	No	No	No	Yes	Yes	No	No	No	?	?	?	?	Yes	No
Prism Video Converter	Yes	Yes	Yes	No	Yes	Yes	Yes	Yes	Yes	Yes	No	Yes	No	No	Yes	Yes
SUPER	Yes	Yes	Yes	Yes	Yes	Yes	Yes	Yes	Yes	Yes	Yes	Yes	?	Yes	Yes	Yes
MiniTool Video Converter	Yes	Yes	No	No	Yes	No	Yes	Yes	Yes	No	No	Yes	No	No	Yes	Yes

Supported target devices
Video converter	Apple-TV	iPad	iPhone	iPod	Android	PSP	PS3	Xbox	HTC	Nokia mobile phones	BlackBerry	Zune	Nintendo DS	Samsung mobile phones
Any Video Converter	Yes	Yes	Yes	Yes	Yes	Yes	Yes	Yes	Yes	Yes	Yes	Yes	Yes	Yes
Avidemux	Yes	Yes	Yes	Yes	Yes	Yes	Yes	Yes	Yes	Yes	Yes	Yes	Yes	Yes
FFmpeg	Yes	Yes	Yes	Yes	Yes	Yes	Yes	Yes	Yes	Yes	Yes	Yes	Yes	Yes
FormatFactory	Yes	Yes	Yes	Yes	No	Yes	Yes	Yes	Yes	Yes	Yes	Yes	No	No
DVDVideoSoft Free Studio	Yes	Yes	Yes	Yes	Yes	Yes	Yes	Yes	Yes	Yes	Yes	Yes	No	Yes
Freemake Video Converter	Yes	Yes	Yes	Yes	Yes	Yes	Yes	No	No	Yes	Yes	No	No	Yes
HandBrake	Yes	Yes	Yes	Yes	Yes	Yes	Yes	Yes	No	No	No	No	No	No
SUPER	No	Yes	Yes	Yes	Yes	Yes	Yes	Yes	Yes	Yes	Yes	Yes	Yes	Yes
MiniTool Video Converter	Yes	Yes	Yes	Yes	Yes	Yes	Yes	Yes	Yes	Yes	Yes	Yes	No	Yes

== Features ==
Video converter	Converts without transcoding	Batch convert	Join files	Converts audio files	Converts photos	Extract audio	Preview	Include effects	Editing tools	DVD burning	Blu-ray burning	Menu templates	Splitting into chapters	Converts online videos	Subtitles support	Upload to YouTube	Variable frame rate inputs
Any Video Converter	No	Yes	Yes	Yes	No	Yes	Yes	Yes	Yes	Yes	Yes	No	Yes	Yes	Yes	No	?
Avidemux	Yes	Yes	Yes	Yes	Yes	Yes	Yes	Yes	Yes	No	No	Yes	Yes	Yes	Yes	No	Yes
FFmpeg	Yes	Yes	Yes	Yes	Yes	Yes	No	Yes	Yes	No	No	Yes	Yes	Yes	Yes	No	Yes
FormatFactory	Partial	Yes	Yes	Yes	Yes	Yes	No	No	No	No	No	No	No	No	Yes	No	?
DVDVideoSoft Free Studio	Yes	Yes	No	Yes	Yes	Yes	Yes	Yes	Yes	Yes	Yes	Yes	No	No	No	Yes	?
Freemake Video Converter	No	Yes	Yes	Yes	Yes	Yes	Yes	Yes	Yes	Yes	Yes	No	Yes	Yes	Yes	Yes	Yes
HandBrake	Partial	Yes	No	Yes	No	No	Yes	No	Yes	No	No	No	Yes	Yes	Yes	No	Yes
SUPER	Yes	Yes	Yes	Yes	No	Yes	Yes	Yes	No	No	No	No	Yes	Yes	Yes	No	?
MiniTool Video Converter	No	Yes	No	Yes	No	Yes	No	No	No	No	No	Yes	No	Yes	Yes	No	Yes

== Help and support ==
Video converter	By telephone	By email	By live chat	By forum
Any Video Converter	No	Yes	No	?
Avidemux	No	Yes	No	Yes
DVDVideoSoft Free Studio	No	Yes	Yes	Yes
FFmpeg	No	Yes	Yes	?
HandBrake	No	No	Yes	Yes
Freemake Video Converter	No	Yes	No	?
SUPER	No	No	No	?
FormatFactory	No	Yes	No	?
MiniTool Video Converter	No	Yes	Yes	No

== See also ==
- Container format
- Comparison of video container formats
- Comparison of video editing software
- WikiCommons' Theora video conversion help page
- Comparison of DVD ripper software
