= JDownloader =

Computer software

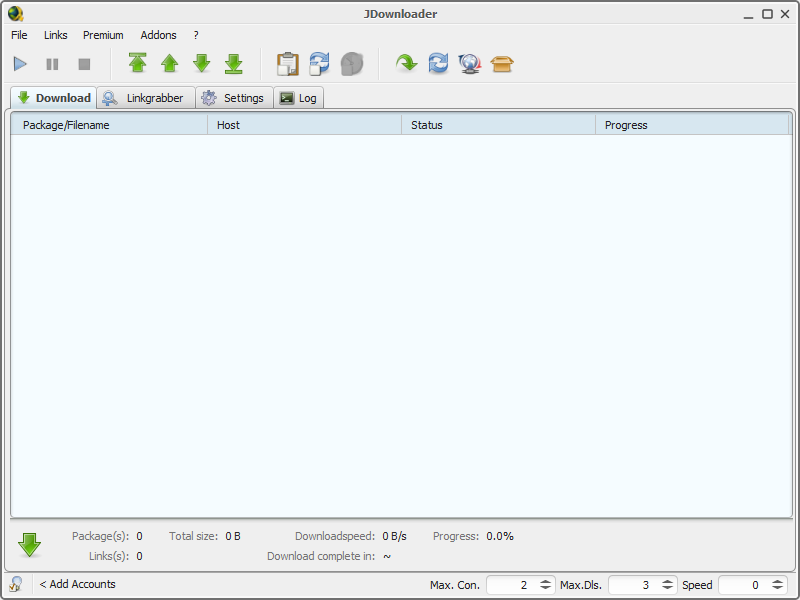
- JDownloader running on a Windows device
- Developer: Appwork GmbH
- Stable release: 2.0 / 26 May 2016
- Written in: Java
- Operating system: Microsoft Windows, Linux, Mac OS
- Platform: Java Platform, Standard Edition
- Type: Download manager
- License: GNU GPLv3 (but partly closed-source)
- Website: www.jdownloader.org
- Repository: svn.jdownloader.org/jdownloader

JDownloader is a donationware download manager, written in Java, which allows automatic download of groups of files from one-click hosting sites. JDownloader supports the use of premium accounts. Some parts of the code are open-source. As a popular software tool used in Europe, in December 2009 the program's website was in the top 1000 visited websites of Spain. German online magazine Chip.de designated it "newcomer of the year" in 2009, after it ranked among the top 50 most downloaded applications, with over half a million downloads in a year.

In 2011, JDownloader was superseded by its successor, JDownloader 2. While support for the original JDownloader still exists on forums, the official site only lists JDownloader 2.

During mid-2012, there were complaints that JDownloader's installer added adware without the user's consent. The JDownloader installation contains adware according to several independent sources. There were further complaints mid-2014. In response, a link to the non-adware version was made available but only in a forum post.

In June 2013, JDownloader's ability to download copyrighted and protected RTMPE streams was considered illegal by a German court. This feature was never provided in an official build, but was supported by a few nightly builds.

== License ==
Contrary to the license, some source files are not publicly available. The developers stated that the license may change—the program will remain mostly open source, but will get a license which allows closed-source parts.

== Features ==
JDownloader is a free, open-source tool available for Microsoft Windows, Linux, and Mac OS, requiring the Java Runtime Environment to run. Among its main features:

- Runs under various operating systems (Microsoft Windows, Linux, Mac, etc.)
- Can download several files simultaneously, over several connections
- Can automatically solve some CAPTCHAs with its own OCR module (JAntiCaptcha)
- Automatic extractor (including password list search) for RAR archives
- Decrypt RSDF, CCF and DLC Container files
- Support for hundreds of file hosting services through decryption plugins
- Supports "hoster plugins" for downloading from specific one-click hosters
- Integrated package manager for additional modules (e.g., web interface, shutdown)
- Theme support
- Multilingual

The user-specified download links are split into packages to enable individual pausing and continuing of downloads. The program can be configured to unpack split RAR archives automatically after all parts have been downloaded.

JDownloader supports "waiting time" and CAPTCHA recognition on many file hosting sites, enabling batch downloads without user input. Premium users of one-click-host sites can use multiple connections per downloaded file, which increases download speed in most cases. It also supports Metalink, a format for listing multiple mirrors. Software updates and minor patches are released frequently; by default JDownloader updates itself upon initialization. As of 2014, JDownloader uses a continuous deployment system where modifications to the program code (e.g. adapting a plugin to changes in a download site's HTTP API) can be released within minutes. For the beta version, frequently occurring errors in plugins are detected via automated error reports (leaving out some privacy-sensitive data including the user's IP address and the name of the downloaded file).
