= Freemake Music Box =

Software app by Ellora Assets Corporation

- Developer: Ellora Assets Corporation
- Initial release: 28 December 2011
- Stable release: 1.0.9 / January 17, 2022; 3 years ago
- Operating system: Microsoft Windows
- Platform: .NET Framework 4
- Size: 17.06 MB
- Available in: English, German, French, Russian, Spanish, Japanese
- License: Freeware
- Website: Official website

Freemake Music Box is the fourth software application developed by Ellora Assets Corporation. It is a freeware program designed to stream free music to users without the need to create an account or set up a subscription.

== Features ==
Freemake Music Box is a Windows application for searching and listening to music from the Internet. The program indexes music legally posted online. Users can input a query in the search box and the application displayed search results which are divided into songs, albums, and artists.

All displayed music tracks are played in sequence with built-in audio player. There are options to loop, pause, stop, and fast forward tracks in the player. The program has the ability to play the music video related to the current song. Freemake Music Box does not offer any option to download music. The program also has features to build and save playlists of music. It also allows to import local playlists from other media players like Winamp, Windows Media Player, AIMP, VLC media player, etc. It has no support for handheld devices or sharing playlists between users.

The program interface is based on Windows Presentation Foundation technology.

The software runs under Windows XP, Windows Vista, and Windows 7 and requires .NET Framework 4.0.

== See also ==
- Freemake Video Converter
- Freemake Video Downloader
- Freemake Audio Converter
- Spotify
