= Philips GoGear =

Series of personal electronic devices

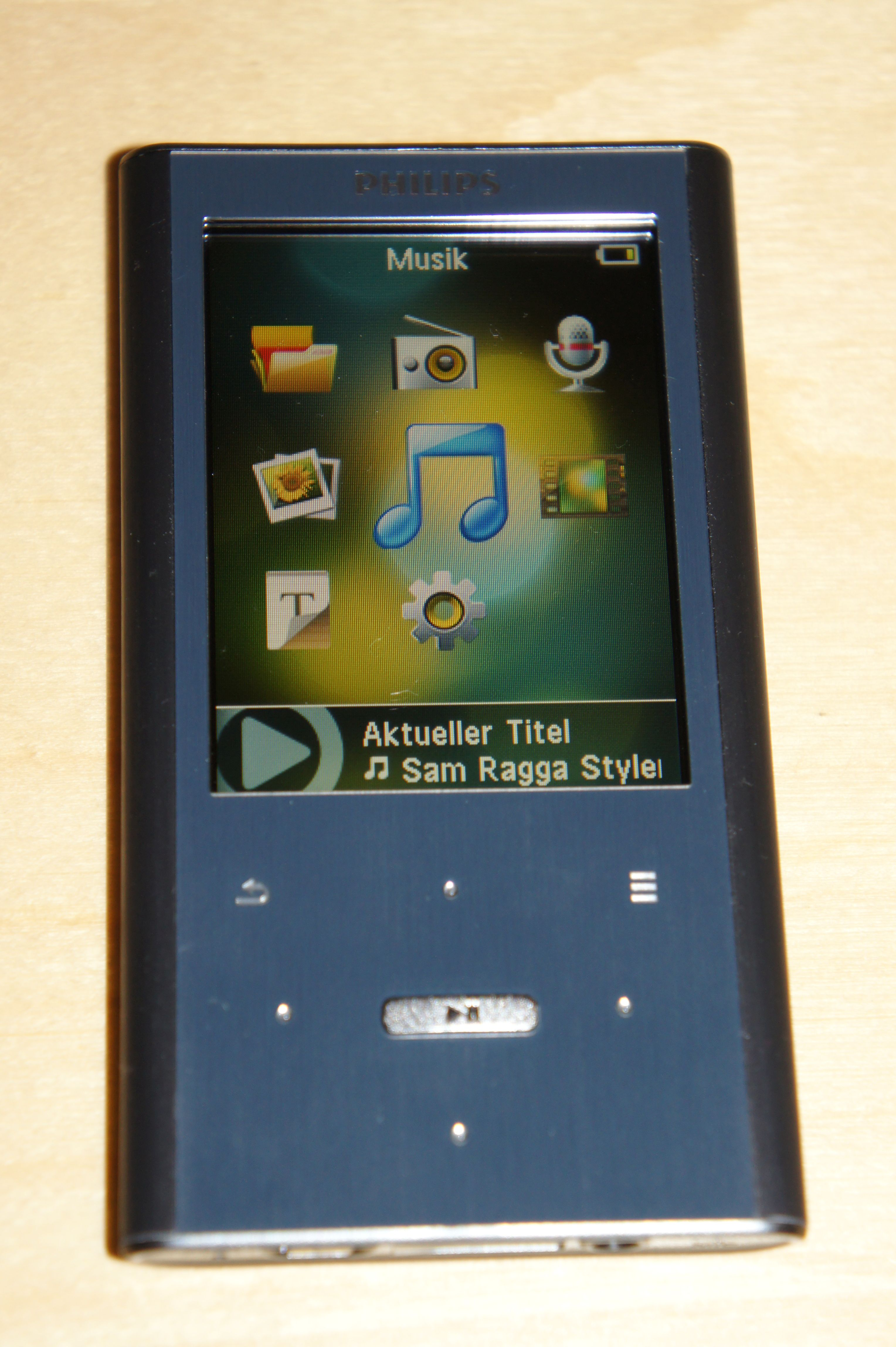
Philips GoGear Ariaz (4 GB portable media player)

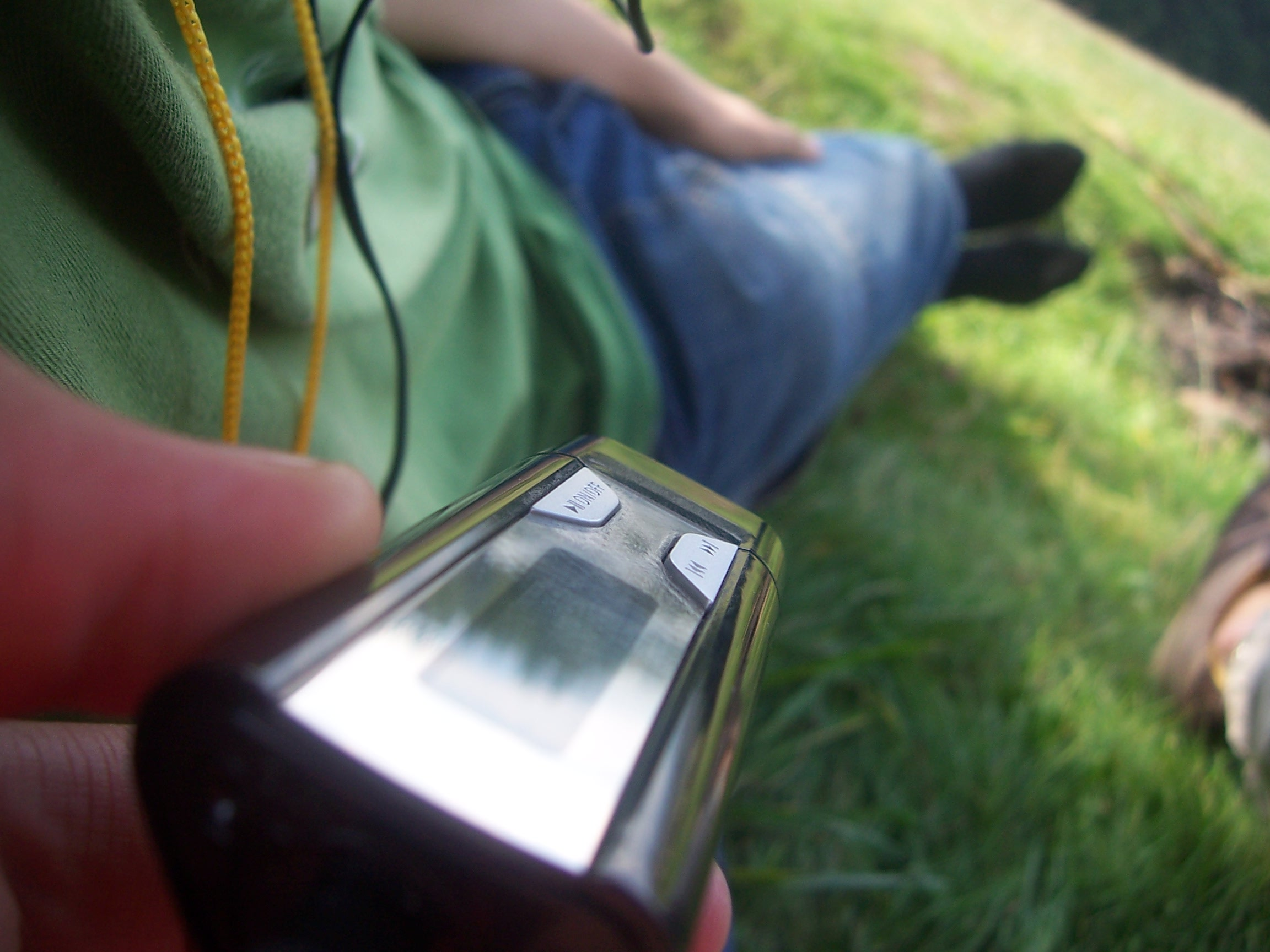
Close-up view of the Philips GoGear SA1110

Philips GoGear is a series of small flash memory and hard drive-based personal electronic devices from Philips. The line includes digital cameras, digital audio players, and audio recorders. The GoGear line is named for the size of its products, all of which are rather small and portable. The digital audio players in the series were primarily designed to compete against the Apple iPod.

== History ==
The GoGear brand was introduced in 2004, although Philips had been making digital audio players for several years prior. One of its well known players was the Philips HDD100 jukebox from 2003 which featured a 15 gigabyte hard drive.

== Device synchronization ==
Like the Philips ShoqBox, the GoGear HDD0xx series of audio players are USB mass storage class devices and therefore support driverless file transfer on most systems; however, files transferred via this method will not be available for playback as they must also be added to a SQLite database. This is done automatically by a modified version of Musicmatch Jukebox included with the player, but alternative software has been developed to update the database. GOLB and openGoGear are two such utilities for Linux.

The original GoGear series (SA32xx) requires ArcSoft Media Converter software to transfer video files, however, audio files may be transferred via driverless file transfer over USB.

The GoGear ViBE, however, does not need any external device synchronization: no specific software is needed, and adding music files to it is as easy as putting the files in the right directory in a USB mass storage device.

Newer GoGear devices, such as the GoGear Aria and GoGear RaGa use Media Transfer Protocol for synchronization as well as the USB mass storage class.

== Alternate firmware ==
The open source firmware project Rockbox has added initial support for the GoGear SA9200 series, and runs well on the HDD16x0 and HDD63x0 series.

== See also ==
- Philips ShoqBox
