= Freemake Audio Converter =

Trialware audio conversion utility

- Developer(s): Ellora Assets Corporation
- Initial release: 29 August 2011
- Stable release: 1.1.10 / 17 January 2022; 3 years ago
- Operating system: Microsoft Windows
- Platform: .NET Framework 4
- Size: 9.6 MB
- Available in: English, German, French, Russian, Spanish, Japanese, Italian, Danish, Dutch
- License: Trialware (Ad-supported and crippleware)
- Website: www.freemake.com/free_audio_converter/

Freemake Audio Converter is an ad-supported audio conversion utility developed by Ellora Assets Corporation. The program is used to convert across different audio formats, merge audio files, and extract audio from video files. Freemake Audio Converter 1.0.0 does not support CD burning. Since 2016, the program has reached a user base of over 63 million people.

== License ==
Freemake Audio Converter may be downloaded free of charge but prevents users from converting files longer than 3 minutes, unless its commercial version is purchased. It may offer to download and install other products from its advertisement partners.

== Features ==
Freemake Audio Converter accepts over 40 audio file formats such as MP3, WMA, WAV, FLAC, AAC, M4A, OGG, AMR, AC3, AIFF, and M4R. It can convert audio to MP3, WMA, WAV, FLAC, AAC, M4A, and OGG, and can prepare files for playback on various portable media players, such as Zune, Coby, SanDisc, Sansa, iRiver, Walkman, Archos, and GoGear. It can convert audio files into M4A and M4R files for iPad, iPhone, and iPod and automatically adds converted files to the iTunes library.

Freemake Audio Converter features a batch audio conversion mode to convert multiple audio files simultaneously. The program can also combine multiple audio files into a single file. The software includes several ready-made presets for each supported output file format and the ability to create a custom preset with the adjustment of bitrate, audio channels, and sample rate.

The program is capable of extracting the audio soundtrack from different video formats, such as DVD, MP4, AVI, MPEG, H.264, MKV, DIVX, MOV, WMV, VOB, 3GP, RM, QT, and FLV.

The user interface of Freemake Audio Converter is based on Windows Presentation Foundation technology.

== See also ==
- Comparison of audio formats
- Freemake Music Box
- Freemake Video Converter
- Freemake Video Downloader
- List of free software for audio
- List of music software
