= Userscript =

Program usually written in JavaScript for modifying web pages

A userscript (or user script) is a program, usually written in JavaScript, for modifying web pages to augment browsing. Uses include adding shortcut buttons and keyboard shortcuts, controlling playback speeds, adding features to sites, and enhancing the browsing history.

On desktop browsers such as Firefox, userscripts are enabled by use of a userscript manager browser extension such as Tampermonkey or Greasemonkey. The Presto-based Opera-supported userscripts (referred to as User JavaScript) are placed in a designated directory. Userscripts are often referred to as Greasemonkey scripts, named after the original userscript manager for Firefox.

On Wikipedia, a user scripts feature is enabled for registered users that allows them to install userscripts to augment editing and viewing of the encyclopedia's pages.

== Userscript managers ==
A userscript manager is a type of browser extension and augmented browsing technology that provides a user interface to manage scripts. The main purpose of a userscript manager is to execute scripts on webpages as they are loaded. The most common operations performed by a userscript manager include downloading, creating, installing, organizing, deleting and editing scripts, as well as modifying script permissions (e.g. website exceptions).

== Userscript repositories ==
One aspect of userscripts is that they can be shared. They can be uploaded to a userscript repository where they become available to other users for downloading.

Historically (circa 2005–2011) userscripts.org, created by American programmer Jesse Andrews, was the largest such repository for userscripts. Over time, the site was transitioned between various maintainers before it went offline completely in May 2014. All that remains is a mirror, which is useful for archival purposes.

A handful of the most active contributors in the userscripts.org community created OpenUserJS, which is actively in use today. Also available is Greasy Fork, a repository largely developed and maintained by Canadian programmer Jason Barnabe.

Users of the Greasemonkey and Tampermonkey extensions may choose to install .user.js scripts from any location.

== See also ==
- List of augmented browsing software
- Scripting language
