= DownThemAll! =

Free and open source download manager extension

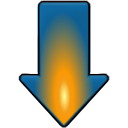

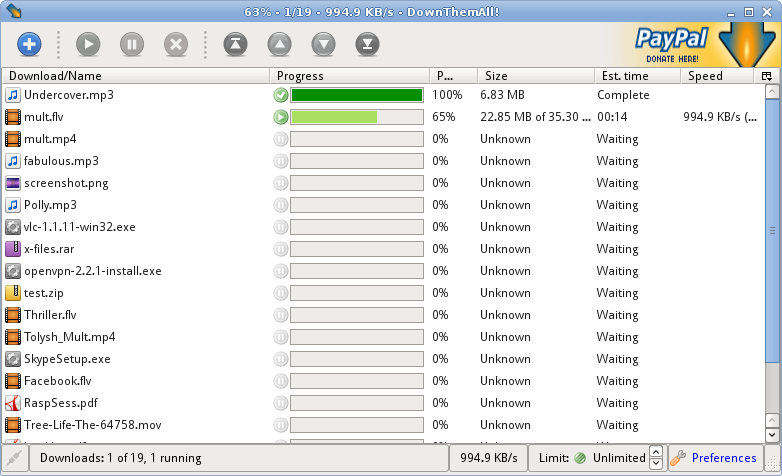
- DownThemAll! screenshot
- Developers: Federico Parodi, Stefano Verna, Nils Maier
- Release: August 13, 2004; 22 years ago
- Stable release: 4.16.1 / 17 October 2026
- Preview release: 4.2.1 Beta (October 6, 2019; 7 years ago) [±]
- Written in: JavaScript, WebExtensions
- Operating system: N/A
- Platform: Chrome, Firefox, Opera
- Available in: 17 languages
- Type: Download manager
- License: GPL-2.0-only
- Website: www.downthemall.net
- Repository: github.com/downthemall/downthemall

DownThemAll! (DTA) is a free and open source download manager browser extension. DTA can download all or some linked files, images, or embedded objects associated with a web page. It can pause, resume, or restart downloads.

== Features ==
As with any download manager, the main feature of older versions of DTA is parallel or multithreaded downloading. This allows the user to download the file in pieces, then combine the pieces after a completed download. This increases the download speed when connected to a slow server. It has Metalink support, which allows multiple URLs for each file to be used, along with checksums and other information about the content. Multithreaded downloading is no longer possible with the transition to the WebExtension version. Other features no longer supported in the WebExtension version are checksum/hash verification, metalinks, and mirror sources.

When extracting links from a page, the user may choose to download only specific files (for example: all PDFs) using wildcard or regular expression inclusive filters.

== Versions ==
All versions of DownThemAll! below 4.0 are incompatible with Firefox 57 or above (Quantum). Version 4.0 transitioned the codebase from XUL/XPCOM to WebExtensions (HTML/CSS/JS/WASM). The first 4.0 beta version was released August 21, 2019. On September 1, 2019, DownThemAll! 4.0 was released, supporting Firefox Quantum.

On September 8, 2019, DownThemAll! 4.0.9 was released for Chrome and Opera add-ons. The Chrome add-on can also be used for other Chromium-based browsers, e.g. Microsoft Edge, Brave and Vivaldi.

DownThemAll! was reviewed by Lifehacker, Wired, Spiegel Online, Tucows.
