= Stylus (browser extension) =

User style manager browser extension

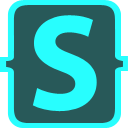
- Original author: Jason Barnabe
- Developer: Stylus Team
- Release: 2017
- Type: Browser extension
- License: GNU General Public License version 3 (GPLv3)
- Website: https://add0n.com/stylus.html
- Repository: https://github.com/openstyles/stylus

Stylus is a free and open source browser extension that can change the appearance and layout of web pages in a user's browser without changing their content by including user-supplied CSS style sheets. The browser extension allows users to install user styles written by other users and includes a built in source-code editor that let users write new and edit existing user styles.

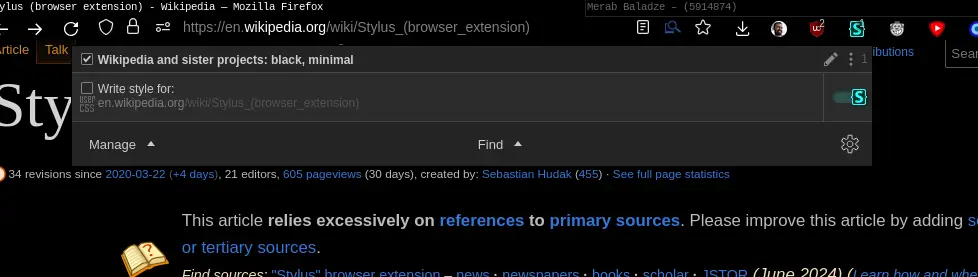
Stylus browser extension in Firefox

== History ==
Stylus was forked from Stylish for Chrome in 2017 after Stylish was bought by the analytics company SimilarWeb. The initial objective was to "remove any and all analytics, and return to a more user-friendly UI." It restored the user interface of Stylish 1.5.2 and removed Google Analytics.

In 2024, Stylus may have been removed from the Chrome Web Store in accordance with new policies preventing Manifest V2 extensions if it had not been updated to Manifest V3. Later that year, it was updated to be based on Manifest V3 on the Chrome Web Store, but its Firefox version remains under Manifest V2.

== Reception ==
Martin Brinkmann reported in May 2017 that "Stylus works as expected". As of December 2020, Stylus had more than 400,000 users on Google Chrome and nearly 70,000 users on Firefox. At that same time, it had an average rating of 4.6 stars on the Chrome Web Store and 4.5 stars on Firefox Add-ons.

== See also ==
- Stylish
- Greasemonkey
