= Freemake Video Converter =

Video editing software

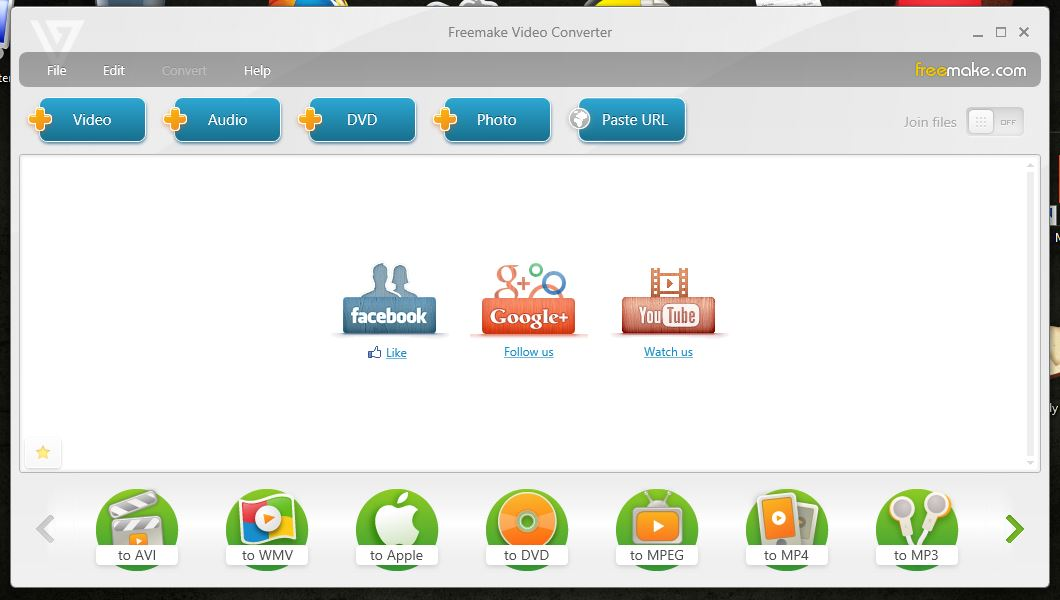
- Screenshot Freemake Video Converter 4.1.6 Interface
- Developer: Ellora Assets Corporation
- Release: 1 July 2010
- Stable release: 4.1.14.1 / 6 December 2022; 3 years ago
- Operating system: Windows
- Platform: .NET Framework 4
- Size: 283 MB
- Available in: English, German, French, Italian, Russian, Spanish, Czech, Chinese and Japanese
- Type: Video editing software
- License: Freemium adware
- Website: www.freemake.com/free_video_converter/

Freemake Video Converter is a freemium video editing app developed by Ellora Assets Corporation. Designed primarily for entry-level users, the software offers a range of functionalities including video format conversion, DVD ripping, and the creation of photo slideshows and music visualizations. Additionally, Freemake Video Converter is capable of burning video streams that are compatible with various media, such as DVDs and Blu-ray Discs. It also features direct video uploading capabilities to platforms like YouTube., enhancing its utility for content creators. The application's user-friendly interface and broad compatibility make it accessible for individuals with minimal video editing experience.

== Features ==
Freemake Video Converter can perform simple non-linear video editing tasks, such as cutting, rotating, flipping, and combining multiple videos into one file with transition effects. It can also create photo slideshows with background music. Users are then able to upload these videos to YouTube.

Freemake Video Converter can read the majority of video, audio, and image formats, and outputs them to AVI, MP4, WMV, Matroska, FLV, SWF, 3GP, DVD, Blu-ray, MPEG and MP3. The program also prepares videos supported by various multimedia devices, including Apple devices (iPod, iPhone, iPad), Xbox, Sony PlayStation, Samsung, Nokia, BlackBerry, and Android mobile devices. The software is able to perform DVD burning and is able to convert videos, photographs, and music into DVD video.

The user interface is based on Windows Presentation Foundation technology. Freemake Video Converter supports NVIDIA CUDA technology for H.264 video encoding (starting with version 1.2.0).

== Important updates ==
Freemake Video Converter 2.0 was a major update that integrated two new functions: ripping video from online portals and Blu-ray disc creation and burning. Version 2.1 implemented suggestions from users, including support for subtitles, ISO image creation, and DVD to DVD/Blu-ray conversion. With version 2.3 (earlier 2.2 Beta), support for DXVA has been added to accelerate conversion (up to 50% for HD content).

Version 3.0 added HTML5 video creation support and new presets for smartphones.

Version 4.0 (introduced in April 2013) added a freemium "Gold Pack" of extra features that can be added if a "donation" is paid. Starting with version 4.0.4, released on 27 August 2013, the program adds a promotional watermark at the end of every video longer than 5 minutes unless Gold Pack is activated. Version 4.1.9, released on 25 November 2015 added support for drag-and-drop functions that were not available in prior versions.

Since at least version 4.1.9.44 (1 May 2017), the Freemake Welcome Screen is added at the beginning of the video, and the big Freemake logo is watermarked in the center of the whole video. This decreases the quality of free outputs, and users are forced to pay money to remove the watermark or stop using it. Version 4.1.9.31 (11 August 2016) does not have this restriction.

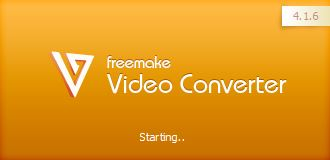
Freemake Video Converter loading screen

== Licensing issues ==
FFmpeg has added Freemake Video Converter v1.3 to its Hall of Shame. An issue tracker entry for this product, opened on 16 December 2010, says it is in violation of the GNU General Public License as it is distributing components of the FFmpeg project without including due credit. Ellora Assets Corporation has not responded yet.

== Bundled software from sponsors ==
Since version 4.0, Freemake Video Converter's installer includes a potentially unwanted search toolbar from Conduit as well as SweetPacks malware. Although users can decline the software during installation, the opt-out option is rendered in gray, which could mistakenly give the impression that it's disabled.

== See also ==
Related software

- Freemake Audio Converter
- Freemake Music Box
- Freemake Video Downloader

Comparison

- Comparison of video converters
- Comparison of video editing software
