= IDM =

IDM may refer to:

== Science and technology ==
- Identity management, the management of the identity life cycle of an entity
  - Novell Identity Manager software, now called NetIQ Identity Manager
- Integrated data management
- Integrated document management
- Integrated device manufacturer, a type of semiconductor company which designs, manufactures, and sells integrated circuit products
- Integrated Direct Metering, a real-time TTL metering method for ambient and flashlight employed by the Pentax LX
- Intelligent device management, a type of enterprise software applications
- Intelligent driver model, a microscopic traffic flow model
- Internet Download Manager, a closed source software download manager
- Infant of a diabetic mother, in medicine; for example see Respiratory disease#Neonatal diseases

== Organizations ==
- IDM (ISP), also known as IncoNet-Data Management S.A.L., an internet service provider
- IDM Computer Solutions, creators of the UltraEdit text editor
- Institute for Disease Modeling, epidemiological research organization in Bellevue, Washington

== Music ==
- Intelligent dance music, a subgenre of electronic music
- Industrial dance music, a fusion of industrial and electronic dance music

== Other uses ==
- Intelligent design movement, a religious campaign promoting the pseudoscientific idea of intelligent design
