= DJ Shiftee =

American DJ and turntablist

- Born: Samuel Morris Zornow; January 27, 1986 (age 40); New York City, New York, United States
- Origin: New York City
- Genres: Hip hop, Turntablism
- Occupations: Record producer, DJ
- Instruments: Sampler; Turntable
- Years active: 1999 – present

Samuel Morris Zornow (born January 27, 1986), better known as DJ Shiftee, is a New York City based DJ and turntablist.

== Career ==
Zornow is the 2009 DMC World DJ Finals Champion, the only American DJ to date to have won the DMC Battle for World Supremacy, and was also the youngest champion to win the DMC New York Regional (age 17 in 2003) until DJ Dwells took the title in 2014, at the age of 13.

Zornow is also a member of the Lo-Livez DJ crew and DJ program director at electronic music production and DJ school, DubSpot. He is featured in several Native Instruments ad campaigns for their flagship Traktor product. He also recently teamed up with Jamie Lidell, Tim Exile, Mr. Jimmy, and Jeremy Ellis to form Mostly Robot, a collaborative music project that premiered at Sonar Festival in Barcelona in 2012.

== Background ==
Zornow was born on January 27, 1986, in New York City to David Zornow, a lawyer, and Martha Zornow, a former lawyer, entertainment executive and teacher who later became a school principal.

Zornow began DJing at age 13 after purchasing a set of turntables and mixer with money from his Bar Mitzvah. Entering his first competition at age 16, Zornow continued on to win several competitions while in high school at Scarsdale High School in Scarsdale, NY. Zornow was runner-up at the 2004 DMC NYC Championships, and stopped competitive DJing despite being inducted to the Lo-Livez crew.

He attended Harvard University, the alma mater of his parents, where he concentrated in mathematics and was actively sought to DJ campus events. In 2007, Zornow returned to competitive DJing after a 3-year leave of absence, winning the DMC Battle for USA Supremacy, and subsequently the DMC Battle for World Supremacy. After graduation from Harvard University, Zornow won the 2009 DMC World DJ Finals, and was awarded the symbolic golden turntables and mixer.

As an instructor, Zornow taught a course in DJ History, Culture, & Technique at Tisch School of the Arts as an adjunct professor starting in the summer of 2010. In addition, Zornow teaches DJing techniques, use of vinyl emulation software, such as Traktor Scratch, and has 2 courses devoted to turntablism techniques at Music Production & DJ School, DubSpot.

Zornow is featured in a series of instructional videos titled, “Shiftee Salsa School of Scratch", the January 2009 cover of DJ Times magazine, and on BBC Radio 1Xtra. He is also endorsed by Native Instruments.

== Awards ==
- 2009 DMC World Champion
- 2009 DMC USA Champion
- 2009 DMC East Coast Champion
- 2008 IDA/ITF Finals World Vice Champion
- 2007 DMC Supremacy World Champion
- 2007 DMC Supremacy USA Champion
- 2004 DMC Regional Wilmington Del Champion
- 2004 Guitar Center NY/NJ Champion
- 2003 DMC Regional NYC Champion
- 2003 ITF Regional East Coast Champion
