= Augmented browsing =

Augmented browsing is the process of modifying or enriching existing web pages by adding new features, altering layouts, or injecting additional data at the client side. Common methods include installing browser extensions, using userscripts (client-side scripts), or applying custom style-sheets. These techniques empower users to customize or enhance how they view and interact with online content.

== History ==
=== Early concepts and experiments ===
- Bookmarklets (1990s): Allowed users to run small JavaScript snippets stored as browser bookmarks, enabling quick modifications of the current web page.
- HyperCard (late 1980s): Introduced the concept of user-driven stacks and scripting, paving the way for more interactive customization mindsets.
- Greasemonkey (2005): An add-on that lets users install or create “user scripts” to dynamically alter web page content. Tampermonkey and Violentmonkey are its successor.

== Modern implementations ==
There are various different methods in order to accomplish web augmentation, from browser extensions to augmentation platforms, but they will all operate on making changes to the underlying DOM content of a website.

=== Browser extension ecosystems ===
- Chrome Web Store, Firefox Add-ons, Safari Extensions: These marketplaces offer extensions that can add or change functionalities for users, covering everything from ad-blocking to user-interface tweaks.
- Community Collaboration: Open-source projects on platforms like GitHub or Git-Lab host user-created scripts and styles, fostering a shared culture of website overspecialization.

=== Web augmentation platforms ===
A web augmentation platform is a framework or service that streamlines the creation, management, and distribution of augmented web experiences. These platforms often provide tools for non-technical users to apply customization without needing deep programming knowledge.

- Webfuse: An example of a web augmentation platform that enables developers and end users to create extensions or “overlays” that customize a site’s appearance and functionality in real time. By leveraging browser APIs, Web-fuse can inject interactive elements, gather data, or modify site components, all within an accessible, user-friendly framework.

=== Technical foundations ===
- DOM Manipulation (JavaScript): Augmentation often relies on reading and rewriting the page Document Object Model (DOM).
- API Access: Browser extension APIs (e.g., Chrome’s chrome.* APIs, Firefox WebExtensions) provide controlled entry points for injecting scripts or intercepting traffic.

== Walled gardens and geographical restrictions ==
=== Emergence of walled gardens ===
A walled garden describes an online environment where a platform strictly controls or curates apps, content, and sometimes user modifications. Examples include Apple’s App Store or closed social media ecosystems, which limit or ban certain forms of augmentation for security or brand consistency reasons.

=== "Splinternet" phenomenon ===
Different nations implement region-specific policies, creating a fragmented internet—sometimes referred to as the “Splinternet.” China’s Great Firewall or Russia’s data localization laws restrict external content or shape how users can access and modify information. These constraints can stifle or complicate web augmentation efforts that rely on unrestricted data flows.

== Social and political movements ==
=== User rights to customize ===
Groups such as the Electronic Frontier Foundation (EFF) argue that users have a right to control their own computing environment. They see web augmentation as a manifestation of digital self-determination—particularly in places where platform or government controls are strict.

=== Resistance and Workarounds ===
- Circumventing Censorship: Some extensions or proxies help users bypass national firewalls or highlight omitted content.
- Ad-Blocking Disputes: Publishers claim ad-blockers (a form of augmentation) undermine revenue, triggering ongoing debates over user autonomy vs. content provider rights.

== See also ==
- Userscripts
- Browser extensions
- Web accessibility
- Ad blocking
- Digital rights
