= ShoqBox =

The ShoqBox is a flash memory-based MP3 player from Philips with attached speakers. Its name is formed from a portmanteau of "shock" and "boombox".

The Philips ShoqBox PSS110 has 256 mb of built in memory.CNET Review of Philips PSS110

The ShoqBox has line-in and radio inputs in addition to the integrated MP3 player. The USB interface for music transfer only supports version 1.1 (2.0 in the European version), which provides much lower maximum bandwidth resulting in longer transfer times.

The ShoqBox is a USB mass storage class device and therefore supports driverless file transfer on most systems; however, files transferred via this method will not be available for playback on the device as they must also be added to an SQLite database. This is done automatically by a customized version of Musicmatch Jukebox included with the player, but alternative software has been developed to update the database.
