= SUPER (computer program) =

Front-end for video players and encoders

- Developer: eRightSoft
- Stable release: SUPER v2022.Build.80+3D+Recorder (December 12, 2022) / December 12, 2022
- Preview release: None
- Operating system: Microsoft Windows
- Platform: x86
- Available in: English
- Type: Transcoding
- License: Advertising-supported software freeware or a full version with Extended Features and no advertisements
- Website: www.erightsoft.com/SUPER.html

Simplified Universal Player Encoder & Recorder (SUPER) is a closed-source front end for open-source software video players and encoders provided by the FFmpeg, MEncoder, MPlayer, x264, ffmpeg2theora, musepack, Monkey's Audio, True Audio, WavPack, libavcodec, and the Theora/Vorbis RealProducer plugIn projects. It was first released in 2005. SUPER provides a graphical user interface to these back-end programs, which use a command-line interface.

== Features ==
SUPER can manipulate and produce many multimedia file formats supported by its back-end programs.

As of 2016, SUPER has a built-in enhanced 3D Video Converter & Recorder engine.

The proposed 3D variations are 3D Anaglyph, Polarized or Shutter side-by-side.

v2017.Build.71+3D+Recorder (April 7, 2017) offers the following encoding modes:

- Normal 2D
- 2D >> 3D
- 3D >> 2D
- 3D >> 3D

Back-end program features supported by SUPER include saving various streaming protocols (mms, RTSP, and HTTP), conversion of Flash Video to other formats, and user-controlled conversion of video between different container formats. Users can choose between various lossless direct audio/video transfers between container formats or lossy video/audio encoding, with encoding possessing the added ability to change video and audio specifications such as bitrate, frame rate, audio channels, resolution, sampling rate, and aspect ratio. SUPER is also able to utilize its back-end's built-in media players, allowing playback of supported video and audio formats.

=== Input file format support ===
File formats supported by SUPER as input source file for playing and transcoding include:

==== Video ====
- 3GP
- ASF
- AVI
- DAT
- Microsoft Digital Video Recording (DVR-MS)
- FLIC animation (FLI and FLC)
- GXF General Exchange Format
- Flash Video (FLV)
- MPEG (both MPEG-1 and MPEG-2)
- Matroska (MKV)
- MPEG-4 Part 14 container (MP4)
- MPEG transport stream (TS and M2T and TRP)
- OGM Theora/Vorbis
- Old PlayStation (STR)
- QuickTime movie (MOV and QT)
- RealVideo (RM and RMVB)
- Shockwave Flash (SWF)
- TiVo (TMF and TY and TY+)
- VivoActive (VIV)
- DVD video files (VOB)
- WebM
- WTV
- Windows Media Video (WMV)

==== Audio ====
- aac
- AC3
- ALAC
- AMR
- FLAC
- MP2
- MP3
- M4A
- Monkey's Audio Lossless (APE)
- Musepack audio SV7 & SV8(MPC)
- Ogg Vorbis
- RealAudio (RA)
- True Audio Lossless (TTA)
- SMAF cell phone audio (MMF)
- WMA
- WavPack Audio Lossless (WV)
- WAV

==== Other ====
- Avisynth scripts (AVS)
- Animated GIF images

== System requirements ==
- Operating System: Windows Vista, Windows Server 2008, Windows 7, Windows Server 2012, Windows 8, Windows 8.1, Windows Server 2016, Windows 10, Windows Server 2019 or Windows 11.
- Administrator privileges (if installed on Administrative account then subsequently converted to a Limited account during the same session, the program will work on the limited).
- Processor: Intel Core i5 processor or equivalent.
- 4GB of available RAM.
- 100GB of free space on the Hard disk where the OS is installed.
- 1024 × 768 video resolution or larger.
- 64,000-color video or more.
- Microsoft DirectX 9.0c.
- IE 10 or later.
- Internet connection.

SUPER is capable of working on machines with lesser capabilities; the actual minimum system requirements depend on the back-end programs and settings chosen by the program user.

== See also ==
- Comparison of video converters
