= Any Video Converter =

Video converter by Anvsoft

- Developer: Anvsoft Inc.
- Stable release: 9.0.9 / March 7, 2025; 20 months ago
- Operating system: Microsoft Windows, macOS
- Size: 6.4 MB
- Available in: 25 languages
- List of languages English, Germany, French, Japanese, Chinese, Arabic, Spanish, Portuguese, others
- Type: Transcoder
- License: Proprietary (freeware and commercial)
- Website: www.anvsoft.com
- As of: 8 September 2017

Any Video Converter (AVC) is a video converter developed by Anvsoft Inc. (Shenzhen Anwell Software Technology Co., Ltd), a multimedia software corporation headquartered in Shenzhen, Guangdong, for Microsoft Windows and macOS. It is available in both a free and paid version. Any Video Converter Windows version won the CNET Downloads 5 star award in 2012.

== Features ==
The software converts most video files into other formats such as AVI, MKV, MOV, Ogg, VOB, MP4, FLV, WMV, MP3, etc.

This freeware also performs functions such as downloading videos from online video-sharing sites such as YouTube, Facebook, Vimeo, Niconico, MetaCafe, etc. Users can edit videos as they like, such as cutting, rotating, flipping, adding video effects, or combining multiple videos into one file. It also allows users to create HTML5 videos with embedding code ready to use for websites, burn videos to DVD or AVCHD DVD disc, and boost video conversion speed up to 5X faster with CUDA acceleration (NVIDIA video card only. It can also use AMD APP Encoder and Inter QSV for X264/H264, X265/H265 video encoding.

== Reception ==
The software has been reviewed as being "ridiculously easy to use" and "interface is easy to manipulate".

AVC was featured as Lifehacker's Download of the Day on November 30, 2006.

Windows Vista Magazine had a tutorial on converting video files with the software for viewing on a PSP in its April 2007 issue. The software was also reviewed in 2008 by MacLife for its capability to convert files for viewing on an iPod.
