= Metalink =

File format that describes one or more computer files available for download

- Filename extension: .meta4, .metalink
- Internet media type: application/metalink4+xml, application/metalink+xml
- Type of format: File distribution
- Extended from: XML, HTTP
- Standard: RFC 5854, RFC 6249

Metalink is an extensible metadata file format that describes one or more computer files available for download. It specifies files appropriate for a user's language and operating system; facilitates file verification and recovery from data corruption; and lists alternate download sources (mirror URIs).

The metadata is encoded in HTTP header fields and/or in an XML file with extension .meta4 or .metalink. The duplicate download locations provide reliability in case one method fails. Some clients also achieve faster download speeds by allowing different chunks/segments of each file to be downloaded from multiple resources at the same time (segmented downloading).

Metalink supports listing multiple partial and full file hashes along with PGP signatures. Most clients only support verifying MD5, SHA-1, and SHA-256, however. Besides FTP and HTTP mirror locations and rsync, it also supports listing the P2P methods BitTorrent, ed2k, magnet link or any other that uses a URI.

== Development history ==
Metalink 3.0 was publicly released in 2005. It was designed to aid in downloading Linux ISO images and other large files on release day, when servers would be overloaded (each server would have to be tried manually) and to repair large downloads by replacing only the parts with errors instead of fully re-downloading them. It was initially adopted by download managers, and was used by open source projects such as OpenOffice.org and Linux distributions. A community developed around it, more download programs supported it (including proprietary ones) and it saw commercial adoption. In 2008, the community took their work to the Internet Engineering Task Force which resulted in Metalink 4.0 in 2010, described in a Standards Track RFC. Metalink 3.0 (with the extension .metalink) and Metalink 4.0 (with the extension .meta4) are incompatible because they have a slightly different format. In 2011, another Standards Track RFC described Metalink in HTTP header fields.

== Client programs ==
Tool	Debian-based	Fedora-based	Arch-based	BSD-based	Windows
aria2 (Note: Tsujikawa, Tatsuhiro. "aria2: The next generation download utility". GitHub.)	Yes	Yes	Yes (Note: "Package Search". Arch Linux. 2021-08-21.)		Yes (Note: "Aria2 Client 1.36.0". Chocolatey. 2021-08-21.)
cURL	No	No	No	No	No
Wget	Yes	Yes	Yes	Yes	Yes
DownThemAll	No	No	No	No	No
jDownloader	not in repo	not in repo	not in repo	not in repo	
KGet	Yes	Yes	Yes	Yes	No
Phex	not in repo	not in repo	not in repo	not in repo	
SmartFTP	not in repo	not in repo	not in repo	not in repo	
easyMule	not in repo	not in repo	not in repo	not in repo	
ZYpp	not in repo	not in repo	not in repo	not in repo	

== Client libraries ==
- libmetalink (MIT License) is a Metalink library written in C. It provides the parsing of Metalink XML files to programs written in C and uses Expat (library) or libxml2. It does not handle the actual downloading of files. Deprecated in cURL.
- metalink-checker (GPL) is a command line downloader written in Python that supports multi-source downloads and chunk checksums, as well as checking mirrors. It can also be used as a Python library.

== In use ==
Mandriva Linux has integrated Metalink into package management with urpmi and aria2. Fedora has integrated Metalink into package management with yum. openSUSE has integrated Metalink into package management with ZYpp and aria2.

Wubi, the Windows-based Ubuntu installer, uses Metadl (LGPL) to download Ubuntu ISO images and takes advantage of Metalink's features of higher availability and increased reliability. If there are errors in the download, they are repaired, instead of restarting the large download.

Appupdater (GPL) for Windows "is similar to apt-get or yum on Linux. It automates the process of installing and maintaining up to date versions of programs."

Currently, OpenOffice.org uses Metalinks to distribute their free office suite. cURL offers Metalinks of their downloads. UniProt Consortium also provides a Metalink for their large protein database. Dofus, a Flash MMORPG uses Metalinks for downloads and so does SageMath, the open-source mathematical software.

According to the main metalinker.org site, the software hosting and collaboration platform Origo generates Metalinks for all hosted releases.

The following Linux distributions use Metalink for ISO image distribution: Adios, Bayanihan Linux, BeleniX, Berry Linux, BLAG Linux and GNU, Bluewhite64 Linux, Damn Small Linux, Fedora, GoboLinux, Granular Linux, KateOS, Linux Mint, openSUSE, Pardus Linux, PCLinuxOS, PuppyLinux, Sabayon Linux, StartCom Enterprise Linux, SUSE Linux, Ubuntu.

The following FreeBSD based distributions use Metalink for ISO image distribution: DesktopBSD, MidnightBSD, and TrueOS.

== Metalink client feature comparison ==
A guide to which clients support which Metalink features:

Client	wget	cURL	DownThemAll	Free Download Manager	GetRight	KGet	Phex	SmartFTP
Licensing	Free Software (GNU General Public License)	Free Software (MIT/X derivate license)	Free Software (GNU General Public License)	Free Software (GNU General Public License)	Proprietary / $29.95 for Standard, $49.95 for Pro	Free Software (GNU General Public License)	Free Software (GNU General Public License)	Proprietary / Free 30 day Evaluation Multiple Editions/$39.99 Professional
Interface	CLI	CLI	GUI	GUI	GUI	GUI	GUI	GUI
Metalink 4.0	Yes	Yes	Yes	No	No	Yes	No	Yes
Runs on Linux	Yes	Yes	Yes	No	No	Yes	Yes	No
Runs on Windows	Yes	Yes	Yes	Yes	Yes	No	Yes	Yes
Runs on Mac OS X	Yes	Yes	Yes	No	No	No	Yes	No
Resume Downloads	?	Yes	Yes	Yes	Yes	Yes	Yes	Yes (Note: "SmartFTP - Features". SmartFTP.)
Segmented Downloads	?	?	Yes	Yes	Yes	Yes	Yes	No
Multiple File support	?	?	Yes	Yes	Yes	Yes	Yes	Yes
"location"	?	?	Yes	No	No	No	No	No
OS	?	?	Yes	Yes	No	No	No	No
Language	?	?	Yes	No	No	No	No	No
HTTP with Transparent Negotiation	?	?	Yes	No	No	No	No	No
Metalink/HTTP	?	?	No	No	No	No	No	No
HTTP	Yes	Yes	Yes	Yes	Yes	Yes	Yes	Yes
FTP	Yes	Yes	Yes	Yes	Yes	Yes	Yes	Yes
BitTorrent	?	No	Yes	Yes	Yes	No	No	
magnet	?	?	No	No	No	No	Yes	No
MD5 Hashes	?	Yes	Yes	Yes	Yes	Yes	Yes	
SHA-1 Hashes	?	Yes	Yes	Yes	Yes	Yes	Yes	
SHA-256 Hashes	?	Yes	Yes	No	No	No	Yes	
Piece Hashes	?	?	No	No	No	No	No	No
PGP Signatures	?	?	No	No	No	No	No	No

No clients support rsync at this time.

== Metalink generation ==
Metalink is formatted as XML so it can be either hand-crafted or created with an XML library, useful for automation. These tools are specifically for Metalink.

- Bouncer is "database driven mirror management app that has three main components - a bounce script, a sentry script to check mirrors and files for integrity and a set of web-based administration tools." Bouncer supports Metalink via a patch that has not yet been integrated upstream.
- Geo McFly (GPL) is an on the fly generator of metalinks based on the downloader's geographical location, written in Python.
- Metalink Editor (GPL) is a Cross Platform GUI Metalink editor written in Python which allows you to create and edit Metalinks.
- Metalink Library (GPL) is a Cross Platform Metalink library for Python and PHP based on Metalink Editor with many automatic features and an easy command-line interface to generate Metalink and Torrent files.
- Metalink Generator can also be used to create Metalinks by filling out a Web form.
- Metalink tools (GPL) Unix/Windows command line tools for generating Metalinks with hashes and mirror/p2p lists.
- Dynamic online metalinks based on metadata. Automatically created metalinks based on metadata published by each mirror.
- MirrorManager (MIT X11 license) is used by the Fedora Project for dynamically listing mirrors.
- MirrorBrain (GPL, Apache License) is a real-time Metalink generator and download redirector. It can either return Metalinks, or automatically redirect non-Metalink clients (per HTTP redirection) to a mirror server near them. Transparent negotiation of Metalinks, embedding PGP signatures, Metalink/HTTP and other advanced features are supported. It is used for instance by openSUSE and OpenOffice.org.

== Example Metalink 4.0 .meta4 file ==
Metalink 4.0 files have the extension .meta4 and are XML text files. They are served with the application/metalink4+xml Internet media type.

 <?xml version="1.0" encoding="UTF-8"?>
 <metalink xmlns="urn:ietf:params:xml:ns:metalink">
   <published>2009-05-15T12:23:23Z</published>
   <file name="example.ext">
     <size>14471447</size>
     <identity>Example</identity>
     <version>1.0</version>
     <language>en</language>
     <description>
     A description of the example file for download.
     </description>
     <hash type="sha-256">3d6fece8033d146d8611eab4f032df738c8c1283620fd02a1f2bfec6e27d590d</hash>
     <url location="de" priority="1">ftp://ftp.example.com/example.ext</url>
     <url location="fr" priority="1">http://example.com/example.ext</url>
     <metaurl mediatype="torrent" priority="2">http://example.com/example.ext.torrent</metaurl>
   </file>
 </metalink>

== Example Metalink/HTTP header fields ==
Metalink in HTTP header fields makes use of existing standard HTTP header fields such as ETags, Link header fields (for mirrors and P2P), and Instance Digests (for hashes).

Etag: "thvDyvhfIqlvFe+A9MYgxAfm1q5="
Link: <http://www2.example.com/example.ext>; rel=duplicate
Link: <ftp://ftp.example.com/example.ext>; rel=duplicate
Link: <http://example.com/example.ext.torrent>; rel=describedby; type="application/x-bittorrent"
Link: <http://example.com/example.ext.meta4>; rel=describedby; type="application/metalink4+xml"
Link: <http://example.com/example.ext.asc>; rel=describedby; type="application/pgp-signature"
Digest: SHA-256=MWVkMWQxYTRiMzk5MDQ0MzI3NGU5NDEyZTk5OWY1ZGFmNzgyZTJlODYzYjRjYzFhOTlmNTQwYzI2M2QwM2U2MQ==

== Example Metalink 3.0 .metalink file ==
Metalink 3.0 files have the extension .metalink and are XML text files.

 <?xml version="1.0" encoding="UTF-8"?>
 <metalink version="3.0" xmlns="http://www.metalinker.org/">
   <files>
     <file name="example.ext">
       <verification>
         <hash type="md5">example-md5-hash</hash>
         <hash type="sha1">example-sha1-hash</hash>
         <signature type="pgp"/>
       </verification>
       <resources>
         <url type="ftp" location="us" preference="90">ftp://ftp.example.com/example.ext</url>
         <url type="ftp" location="uk" preference="90">ftp://ftp.example.net/example.ext</url>
         <url type="http" location="us" preference="90">http://example.com/example.ext</url> 
         <url type="http" location="de" preference="90">http://example.net/example.ext</url>
         <url type="bittorrent" preference="100">http://example.org/example.ext.torrent</url>
         <url type="rsync"/>
         <url type="magnet"/>
         <url type="ed2k"/>
       </resources>
     </file>
   </files>
 </metalink>

== See also ==
- ed2k URI scheme
- Magnet URI scheme
- Named data networking
