= Internet Download Manager =

Shareware down manager

- Developer: Tonec Inc.
- Release: 2.8 / 2 June 2001; 25 years ago
- Stable release: 6.43 Build 19 / 4 November 2026; 15 days ago
- Written in: C, C++
- Operating system: Windows 7 and later
- Platform: IA-32, x64
- Size: About 11 MB
- Available in: 50+ languages
- Type: Download manager
- License: Proprietary
- Website: internetdownloadmanager.com

Internet Download Manager (IDM) is a commercial download manager software application for the Microsoft Windows operating system owned by American company Tonec, Inc.

IDM is a tool that assists with the management and scheduling of downloads. It can utilize the full bandwidth available to the device, and contains recovery and resume capabilities to continue downloading files that were interrupted due to a loss of network connection or other unexpected failures. IDM speeds up downloads by splitting the target file into several parts, depending on the file size, then downloading the split files simultaneously. IDM then combines the downloaded split files into a full file.

IDM supports a wide range of proxy servers such as firewalls, FTP, HTTP protocols, cookies, MP3 audio and MPEG video processing. It is compatible with most popular web browsers.

== Features ==
- Divides downloads into multiple streams for faster downloading.
- Batch downloads.
- Import/Export download jobs.
- Auto/manual updating of download address.
- Multiple queues.
- Video downloading from streaming video sites.
- Authentication protocols: Basic, NTLM, and Kerberos allowing for storage and auto-authentication of user names and passwords.

== Reception ==
Softpedia gave IDM a rating of 5/5 stars, praising its convenience, effectiveness and diversity of options. An extended review has been done by Softpedia in March 2014; giving the software 4/5 stars, but criticized IDM for not having released a major version since 2010. A third Softpedia review in 2022 returned IDM's original rating of 5/5 stars again.
