= Tampermonkey =

Userscript manager browser extension

- Original author: Jan Biniok
- Developer: Jan Biniok
- Release: May 2010
- License: Proprietary (donationware)
- Website: www.tampermonkey.net
- Repository: github.com/Tampermonkey/tampermonkey

Tampermonkey is a userscript manager that enables the user to add and use userscripts, which are JavaScript programs that can be used to modify web pages. It is available as a browser extension.

== History ==
Tampermonkey was first created in May 2010 by Jan Biniok. It first emerged as a Greasemonkey userscript that was wrapped to support Google Chrome. Eventually the code was re-used and published as a standalone extension for Chrome which had more features than Chrome's native script support. In 2011, Tampermonkey was ported to Android, enabling users to use userscripts on Android's internal browser. In January 2013, after the publication of version 2.9, Jan Biniok decided to change Tampermonkey from open source (GPLv3) to closed source (proprietary). By 2019, Tampermonkey had over 10 million users. By 2022 Tampermonkey was one of 33 extensions on the Chrome Web Store to have at least 10 million users.

=== Chrome manifest V3 ===
In January 2019, Biniok wrote in a Google Groups post that the new Chrome manifest V3 would break the extension. The new manifest would ban remotely accessed code which Tampermonkey is dependent on. The userscripts use code that is created by developers not at Google, rather they are created by third-party developers at places like Userscripts.org and Greasyfork. This code is inserted after the extension is installed, however the manifest requires the code to be present at installation.

== Controversy ==
On January 6, 2019, Opera banned the Tampermonkey extension from being installed through the Chrome Web Store, claiming it had been identified as malicious. Later, Bleeping Computer was able to determine that a piece of adware called GOM Player would install the Chrome Web Store version of Tampermonkey and likely utilize the extension to facilitate the injection of ads or other malicious behavior. The site stated, "This does not mean that Tampermonkey is malicious, but rather that a malicious program is utilizing a legitimate program for bad behavior," going on to call Opera's blacklisting the extension for this reason a "strange decision".

== See also ==
- List of augmented browsing software
- Greasemonkey
