= Freemake Video Downloader =

Software for downloading online video and audio

- Developer: Ellora Assets Corporation
- Release: 1 July 2010
- Stable release: 4.1.14 / 17 January 2022; 4 years ago
- Written in: C#
- Operating system: Windows Vista or later
- Size: 13.59 MB
- Available in: 18 languages
- List of languages English, Brazilian Portuguese, Chinese (Traditional), Chinese (Simplified), Czech, Dutch, French, German, Greek, Hungarian, Italian, Polish, Russian, Slovak, Slovenian, Spanish, Turkish, Vietnamese
- Type: Download manager
- License: Crippleware
- Website: m.freemake.com/free_video_downloader_agile/

Freemake Video Downloader is a crippleware download manager for Microsoft Windows, developed by Ellora Assets Corporation. It is proprietary software that can download online video and audio. Both HTTP and HTTPS protocols are supported. Users must purchase a premium upgrade to remove Freemake branding on videos and unlock the ability to download media longer than 3 minutes in length. The program contains adware.

== Features ==
The GUI provides several modal windows that help to access different program features, including download progress, download queue, output file saving options, download history, program settings.

=== Technical capabilities ===
- Batch downloading support for downloading multiple files
- Flash and HTML5 video download from sites like YouTube and Google Video
- Pausing and resuming downloads
- Video conversion of downloaded files into list of predefined formats which are supported by the program

==== Premium Pack ====
Users may purchase (communicated as a "donation" in the software's dialog) a Premium Pack to unlock features such as full-speed downloading and disabling of the added Freemake branding in all downloaded media.

- Download videos longer than 3 minutes in length
- Removal of Freemake branding in all downloaded videos
- Download speed control (limited in the free to try version)
- Download via proxy connection
- Automatic file export to Apple iTunes

=== Technical requirements ===
- OS: Windows 7 and above
- Processor: 1 GHz or higher
- RAM: 1 GB or higher
- Disk space: 30 MB
- .NET Framework 4.5

== Criticism ==
Freemake Video Downloader is criticized for toolbar and web search engine installation. Freeware offers to install sponsored software upon installation changing default search engine and browsers homepage. Users may opt-out of sponsored software, but it has been criticized on several pages.

== See also ==
- Comparison of download managers
