= Download =

Computer file operation

Symbols that indicate downloading are commonly shown as an arrow pointing down at a drive, tray, or line.

In computer networks, download means to receive data from a remote system, typically a server such as a web server, an FTP server, an email server, or other similar systems. This contrasts with uploading, where data is sent to a remote system.

A download is a file offered for downloading or that has been downloaded, or the process of receiving such a file.

== Definition ==
Download data is sent downstream to an end-user, upstream from the provider. ISP = internet service provider.

Downloading generally transfers entire files for local storage and later use, as contrasted with streaming, where the data is used nearly immediately while the transmission is still in progress and may not be stored long-term. Websites that offer streaming media or media displayed in-browser, such as YouTube, increasingly place restrictions on the ability of users to save these materials to their computers after they have been received.

Downloading on computer networks involves retrieving data from a remote system, like a web server, FTP server, or email server, unlike uploading, where data is sent to a remote server. A download can refer to a file made available for retrieval or one that has been received, encompassing the entire process of obtaining such a file.

Downloading is not the same as data transfer; moving or copying data between two storage devices would be data transfer, but receiving data from the Internet or BBS is downloading.

== Copyright ==
Downloading media files involves the use of linking and framing Internet material and relates to copyright law. Streaming and downloading can involve making copies of works that infringe on copyrights or other rights, and organizations running such websites may become vicariously liable for copyright infringement by causing others to do so.

Open hosting servers allow people to upload files to a central server, which incurs bandwidth and hard disk space costs due to the files generated with each download. Anonymous and open hosting servers make it difficult to hold hosts accountable. Taking legal action against the technologies behind unauthorized "file sharing" has proven successful for centralized networks like Napster, and untenable for decentralized networks like Gnutella or BitTorrent. The leading YouTube audio-ripping site agreed to shut down after being sued by a huge coalition of recording labels.

Downloading and streaming relates to the more general usage of the Internet to facilitate copyright infringement, also known as "software piracy". As overt static hosting of unauthorized copies of works (i.e., centralized networks) is often quickly and uncontroversially rebuffed, legal issues have in recent years tended to deal with the usage of dynamic web technologies (decentralized networks, trackless BitTorrents) to circumvent the ability of copyright owners to directly engage particular distributors and consumers.

=== Litigations in European Union ===
In Europe, the Court of Justice of the European Union (CJEU) has ruled that it is legal to create temporary or cached copies of works (copyrighted or otherwise) online. The ruling relates to the British Meltwater case settled on 5 June 2014.

The judgement of the court states that: "Article 5 of Directive 2001/29/EC of the European Parliament and of the Council of 22 May 2001 on the harmonisation of certain aspects of copyright and related rights in the information society must be interpreted as meaning that the copies on the user's computer screen and the copies in the internet 'cache' of that computer's hard disk, made by an end-user in the course of viewing a website, satisfy the conditions that those copies must be temporary, that they must be transient or incidental in nature and that they must constitute an integral and essential part of a technological process, as well as the conditions laid down in Article 5(5) of that directive, and that they may therefore be made without the authorisation of the copyright holders."

On April 17, 2009, a Swedish court convicted four men operating The Pirate Bay Internet site of criminal copyright infringement. The Pirate Bay was established in 2003 by the Swedish anti-copyright organization Piratbyrån to provide information needed to download film or music files from third parties, many of whom copied the files without permission. The Pirate Bay does not store copies of the files on its own servers but does provide peer-to-peer links to other servers on which infringing copies were stored. Apparently, the theory of the prosecution was that the defendants, by their conduct, actively induced infringement. Under U.S. copyright law, this would be a so-called Grokster theory of infringement liability.

The Swedish district court imposed damages of SEK 30 million ($3,600,000) and one-year prison sentences on the four defendants. "The defendants have furthered the crimes that the file sharers have committed," said district court judge Tomas Norstöm. He added, "They have been helpful to such an extent that they have entered into the field of criminal liability." "We are, of course, going to appeal," defense lawyer Per Samuelsson said. The Pirate Bay has 25 million users and is considered one of the biggest file-sharing websites in the world. It is conceded that The Pirate Bay does not itself make copies or store files, but the court did not consider that fact dispositive. "By providing a website with ... well-developed search functions, easy uploading and storage possibilities, and with a tracker linked to the website, the accused have incited the crimes that the filesharers have committed," the court said in a statement.

== See also ==
- Bandwidth
- Copyright aspects of hyperlinking and framing
- Download manager
- Digital distribution
- HADOPI law
- Music download
- Peer-to-peer
- Progressive download
- Sideloading
- List of download managers
