= Download manager =

Software tool

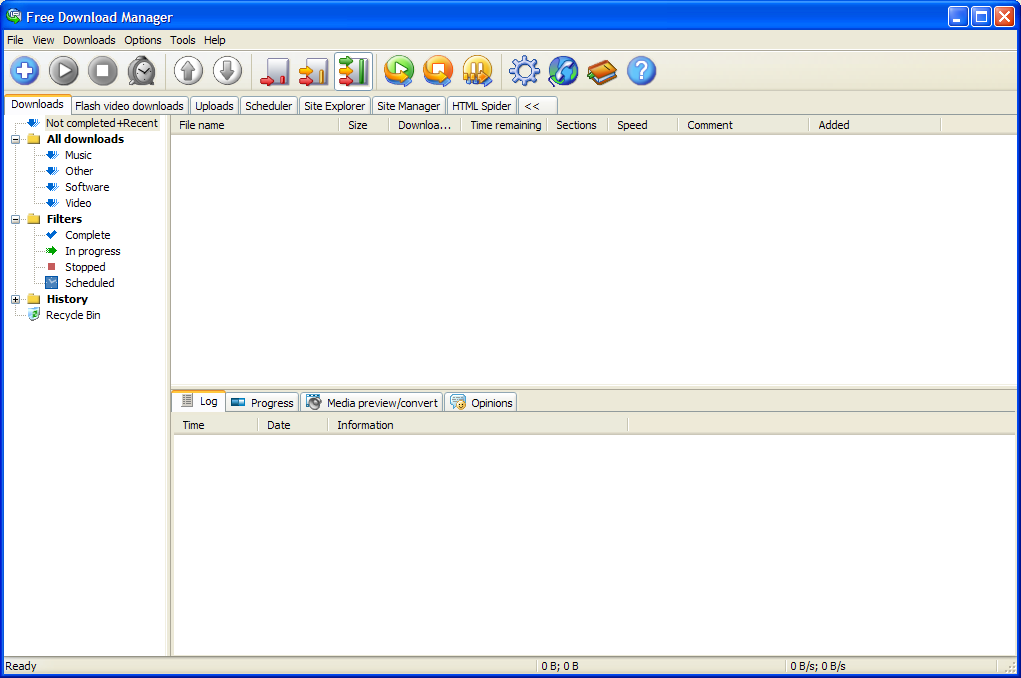
Screenshot of Free Download Manager v2.5.723.

A download manager is a type of software that manages the downloading of files from the Internet, which may be built into a web browser, or as a stand-alone program.

== Functions ==
A download manager manages files being downloaded from the internet. Download managers allocate resources for downloading multiple items simultaneously. They also break down files into multiple chunks for faster download speeds, either by making multiple connections to the same server (to overcome per-connection throttling or overly pessimistic TCP congestion control) or to multiple servers providing the same file (multi-source). Failed downloads can also be restarted from a download manager.

Download managers may be separate programs or may be built into web browsers or other programs, such as Firefox's and Telegram's built-in download managers.

== Criticism ==
Download managers are occasionally used to spread malware or advertisements onto a user's computer. For example, the download page for Free Download Manager was hacked and used to spread malware on Linux devices from 2020 to 2022. Other download managers have been noted to contain advertisements, be identified as malware by antivirus software, or attempt to install unwanted software during installation.

== See also ==
- Comparison of download managers
- Comparison of file-sharing applications
