= Qwant =

Search engine based in France

- Website type: Search engine
- Available in: Multilingual
- Headquarters: Paris, France
- Owners: Synfonium (Miroslaw et Octave Klaba (75 %), Caisse des dépôts et consignations (25 %))
- Founders: Jean-Manuel Rozan, Éric Léandri, Patrick Constant
- Website: www.qwant.com
- Commercial: Yes
- Registration: None
- Launched: July 2013; 13 years ago
- Current status: Active
- Content license: Proprietary

Availability of Qwant by country: (Note: As of Jan 2026) Currently available Not available

Qwant (French pronunciation: [kwɑ̃t]) is a French search engine, launched in February 2013. Qwant says that it is focused on privacy, does not track users, resell personal data, or deliberately bias the display of search results. Its results are similar to the Microsoft Bing search engine. However, it is used only in case Qwant lacks information of certain website and for image searches. As of 2023, Qwant could be accessed from around 30 countries.

Both the French Government and the European Parliament use Qwant as the default search engine on their computers, replacing Google in 2020 and 2026 respectively.

== Etymology ==
The name Qwant is a combination of quantique, French for 'quantum [adjective]', and the English word want.

== History ==
=== Creation ===
Qwant was created on May 25, 2011 in Nice by investors Jean-Manuel Rozan, Éric Léandri, and Patrick Constant (via his company Pertimm, which developed other search engines for retail and other commercial services).

The metasearch engine was launched in beta in 15 countries and 35 languages on 16 February 2013, and in its final version on 4 July 2013 in its French localization.

=== Development ===
In its initial phase, Qwant used Bing’s API for searches but started a gradual transition to its own indexing system starting in February 2013. This process lacked personnel and technology. While Qwant promoted its own engine for indexing social media and "shopping" search results, it continued to rely heavily on external APIs.

In June 2014, the German publishing group Axel Springer invested 20% in Qwant to support the development of a specialized indexing robot for news in French, aimed at competing with Google News.

On 14 April 2015, Qwant unveiled a new version of its search engine with an updated graphical interface.

In October 2016, the European Investment Bank announced an investment in the company in the form of a €25 million loan over 5 years to expand its reach in Europe.

In February 2017, Qwant announced that it had raised €18.5 million, including €15 million from the Deposits and Consignments Fund (CDC), which has a 20% stake, with the remainder coming from the Axel Springer group.

On 4 July 2018, a new, more streamlined version of Qwant was unveiled, version four; its logo was also changed for this new version.

By early 2019, Qwant was considered to be completely reliant on Bing for web and image searches, producing results entirely through the Bing API as Qwant had neither a crawler nor an indexer at the time.

==== Restructuring ====
In May 2019, Qwant announced that it would migrate its servers to an infrastructure based on Microsoft Azure, and also keep some of its indexing capacity on its infrastructure.

In January 2020, Jean-Claude Ghinozzi became the CEO of Qwant, replacing Éric Léandri.

At the end of June 2020, Qwant began restructuring. The closure of its Épinal and Ajaccio offices was announced to meet a requirement from major shareholders, the CDC and Axel Springer.

In 2020, Qwant's net sales increased by 28% to €7.5 million. Losses fell to €13 million from €23.5 million in 2019.

==== New direction ====
In 2021, Raphaël Auphan (managing director) and Corinne Lejbowicz (president) assumed management of Qwant. Rather than aiming to dethrone Google, the new management plans "to build step by step a real ecosystem of private and secure navigation on the Internet."

According to the new executives, the old Qwant shone by its opacity:

1. the company kept the blur on its actual use
2. minimized its use of Bing
3. was divided into a dozen legal structures according to the new management, which concealed the extent of the problems.

In early 2022, a new executive committee composed the management of Qwant: Laurent Ach CTO, Flore Blanchard-Dignac, CMO and Amélie Mathieu, CFO.

In 2020, Qwant discontinued its services in several countries but remained available in 39 countries worldwide.

==== Acquisition by Synfonium ====
On 11 April 2023, the French entrepreneur Octave Klaba announced his intent to acquire Qwant via a newly created holding company, Synfonium; the search engine was fully acquired by the company on 24 July.

==== Partnership with Ecosia and reduced dependency on Microsoft ====
In 2023, Microsoft dramatically raised Bing's search API rates. Since Qwant relied on Bing to provide results for long tail searches, the change forced Qwant to change its business model. In response, Qwant and Germany's Ecosia teamed up to create a 50–50 joint venture called the European Search Perspective (EUSP). Qwant will transfer the search indexing infrastructure it was building as well as some of its engineers and data scientists. Ecosia is making a cash contribution.

In August 2025, EUSP announced that its index named Staan, started to serve queries notably for Qwant's AI summaries while Ecosia planned to use it. Talks were underway with other companies for using the index.

During 2026 edition of VivaTech, Qwant announced the public opening of Staan API which is exclusively targeted towards AI workflows. In this sector, Google giving very limited access while Microsoft announcing the end of Bing Search API, Staan have a chance to seize market shares.

As of February 2021, Qwant is no longer accessible or providing service in Turkey.

=== Usage ===
Qwant reported 3.5 million monthly views shortly after its launch, which grew to 17.7 million by February 2016 with traffic doubling in the preceding six months. In May, the site claimed 21 million visits with 50% of visits coming from France and 30% from Germany. In November, it claimed nearly 27 million monthly visits and 37 million at the beginning of 2017.

At the end of July 2017, Qwant claimed 40 million monthly visits. It was also reported that Qwant held a 2% market share in France and 1% in Germany.

In June 2018, Qwant claimed to be the second most used search engine in France, and to have entered the top 50 most visited websites in France and the top 1,000 worldwide.

In the first half of 2020, Qwant was the fourth most popular search engine in France, behind Google, Bing and Yahoo, and ahead of Ecosia and DuckDuckGo.

As of 2024, Qwant reported 6 million users globally.

==== European Digital Sovereignty ====
In October 2018 the French Minister of the Armed Forces, Florence Parly, announced that her ministry would now use Qwant instead of Google as its default search engine; the French aerospace and defence company Safran later announced in January 2019 that it had also selected Qwant as the new default search engine on the workstations of its 91,000 employees. In an interview with CIO in February, The Chief Information Officer of the company, Loïc Bournon, explained that he had chosen the search engine due to its ethical use of personal data, and to promote the use of European technology. In April, the French national space agency, CNES, also made the move to Qwant for all of its employees at its 4 centres of excellence. The French National Assembly (AN) announced in September that Qwant, rather than Google, would be adopted as the default search engine on the computers of all its services, including those of its deputies. Ultimately, on 7 January 2020, the French Interministerial Directorate for Digital Affairs (DINUM) instructed that Qwant be installed as the default search engine on all government devices, both desktop and mobile, by 30 April of that year.

On 3 June 2026, the European Parliament announced that from the following day Qwant would become the default search engine used on its computers, replacing Google. Officials stated that the change was "in line with the Parliament's commitment to digital sovereignty and the protection of users' personal data". The move followed pressure by MEPs in November 2025 to reduce the European Parliament's reliance on American technology companies, in favour of European alternatives.

=== Versions ===
At its beginnings, Qwant results were categorized and displayed as a mosaic of images and videos on top of five columns:

- web
- live: only news sites results
- Qnowledge graph: mainly Wikipedia information
- social: only social media results
- shopping: only e-commerce sites results

In June 2017, a version adapted to the Swiss culture was launched and offered in three of the four national languages: German, French, and Italian.

In January 2018, Qwant announced its expected arrival in China by the summer of 2018, in partnership with local authorities and companies to adapt it to Chinese laws. The five-year-anniversary version launched in 2018 eliminated the column-based presentation in favor of a more web-friendly presentation. The different types of current/social research remained accessible through a side menu.

On 3 December 2019, Qwant announced the arrival of a new design to "simplify the experience and bring new experiences". In March 2021, a new version was made available online to rejuvenate the interface and make it more accessible on smartphones.

In June 2022, Qwant unveiled a new identity to engage new hearings on the importance of personal data protection.

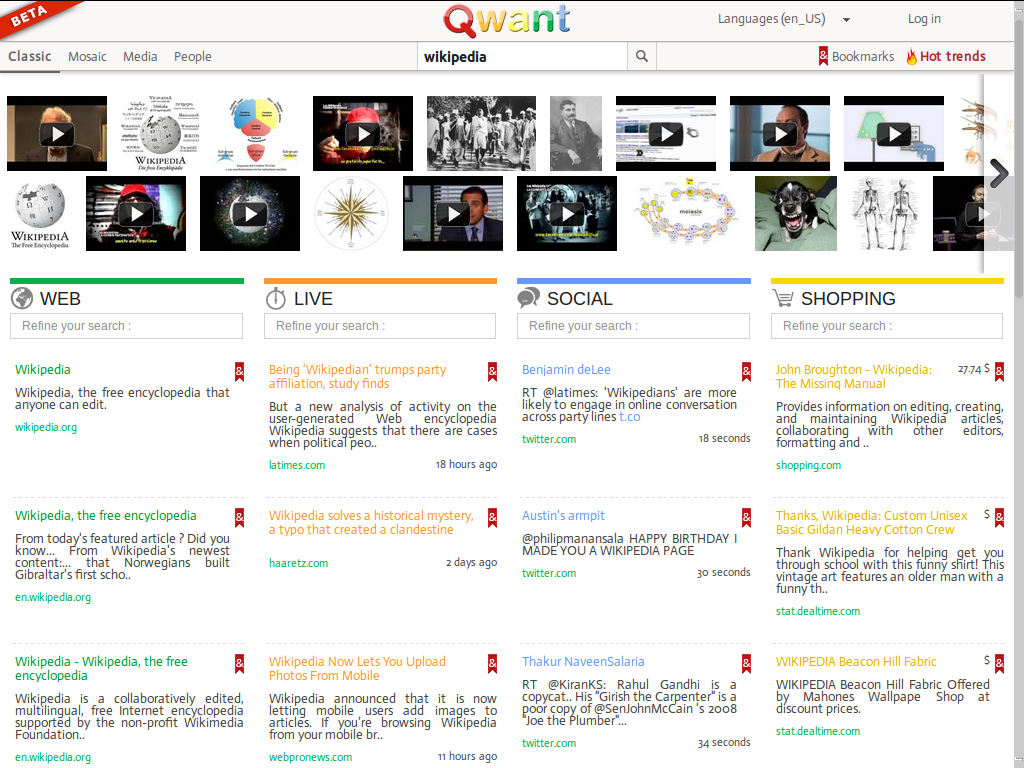

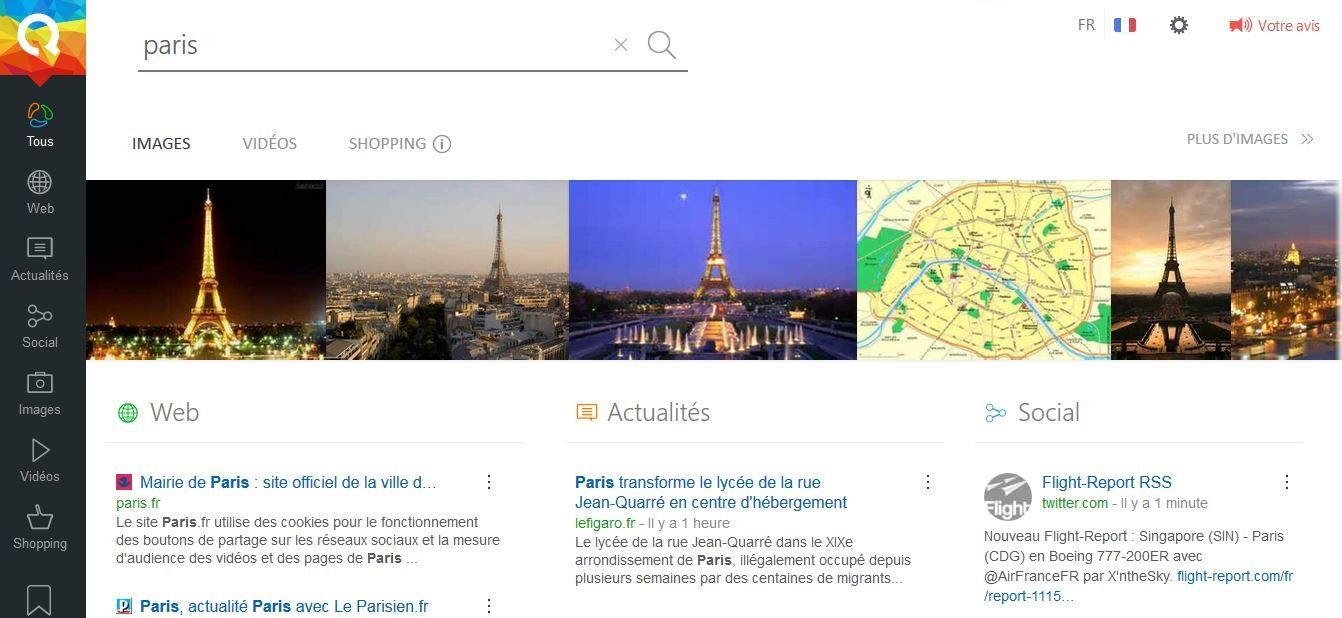

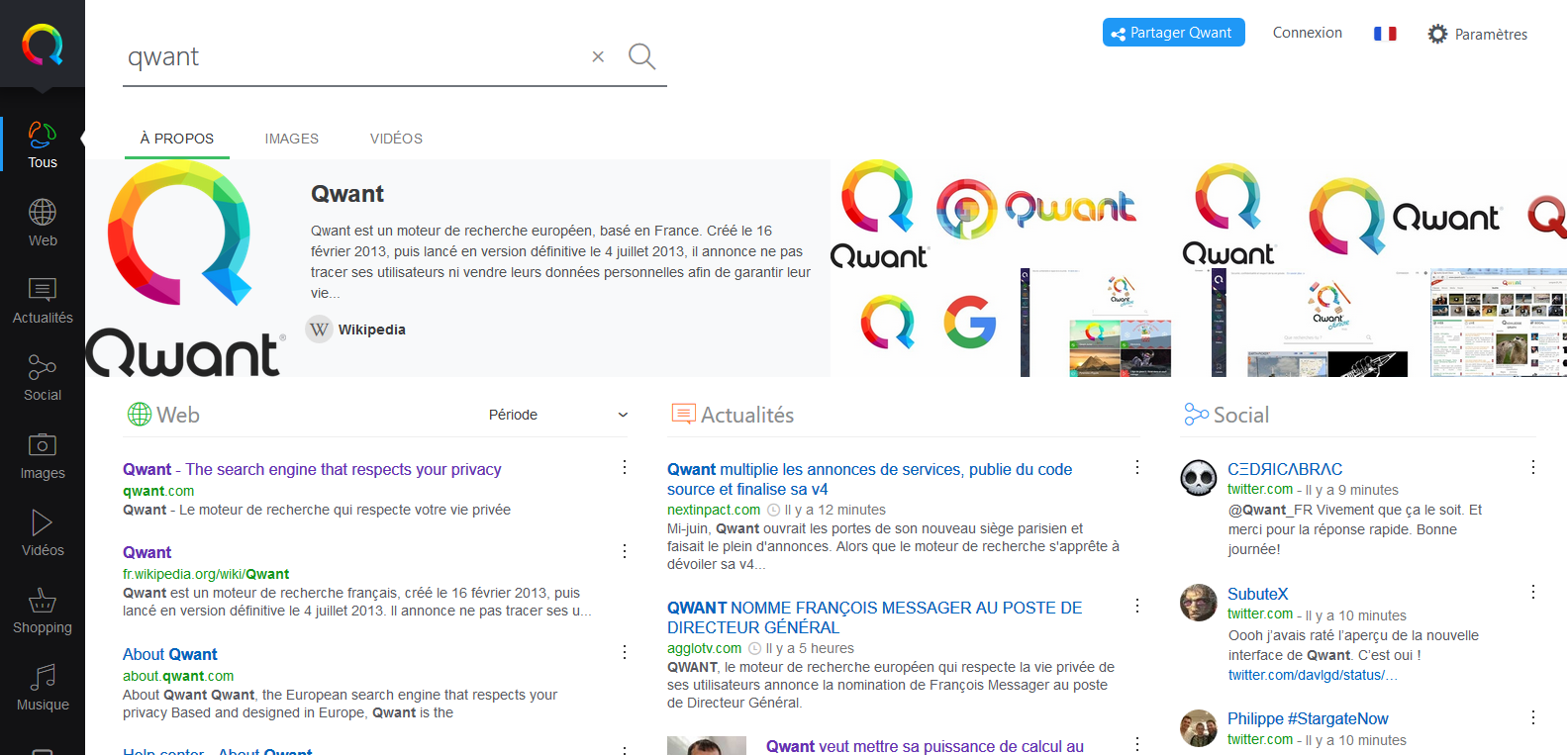

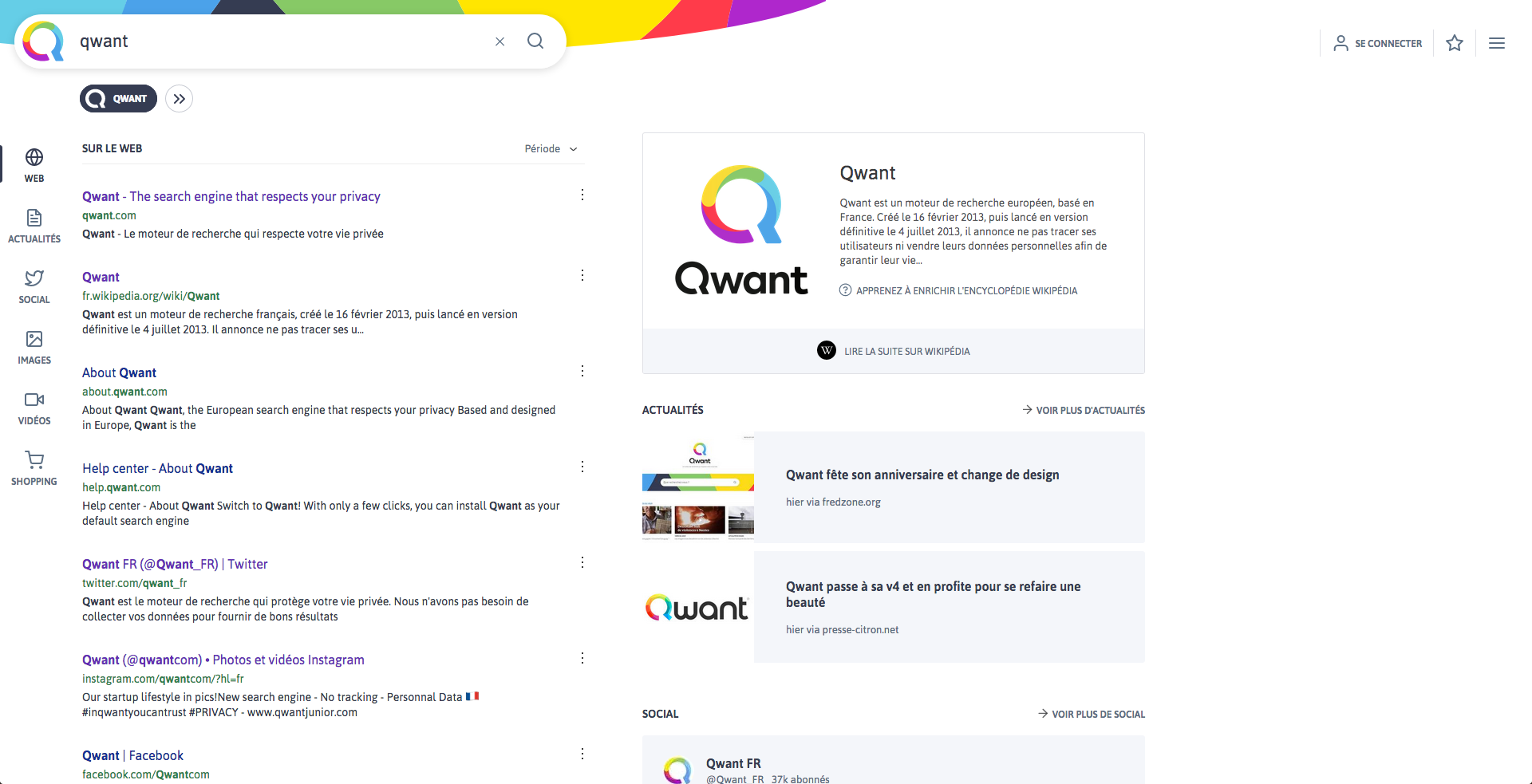

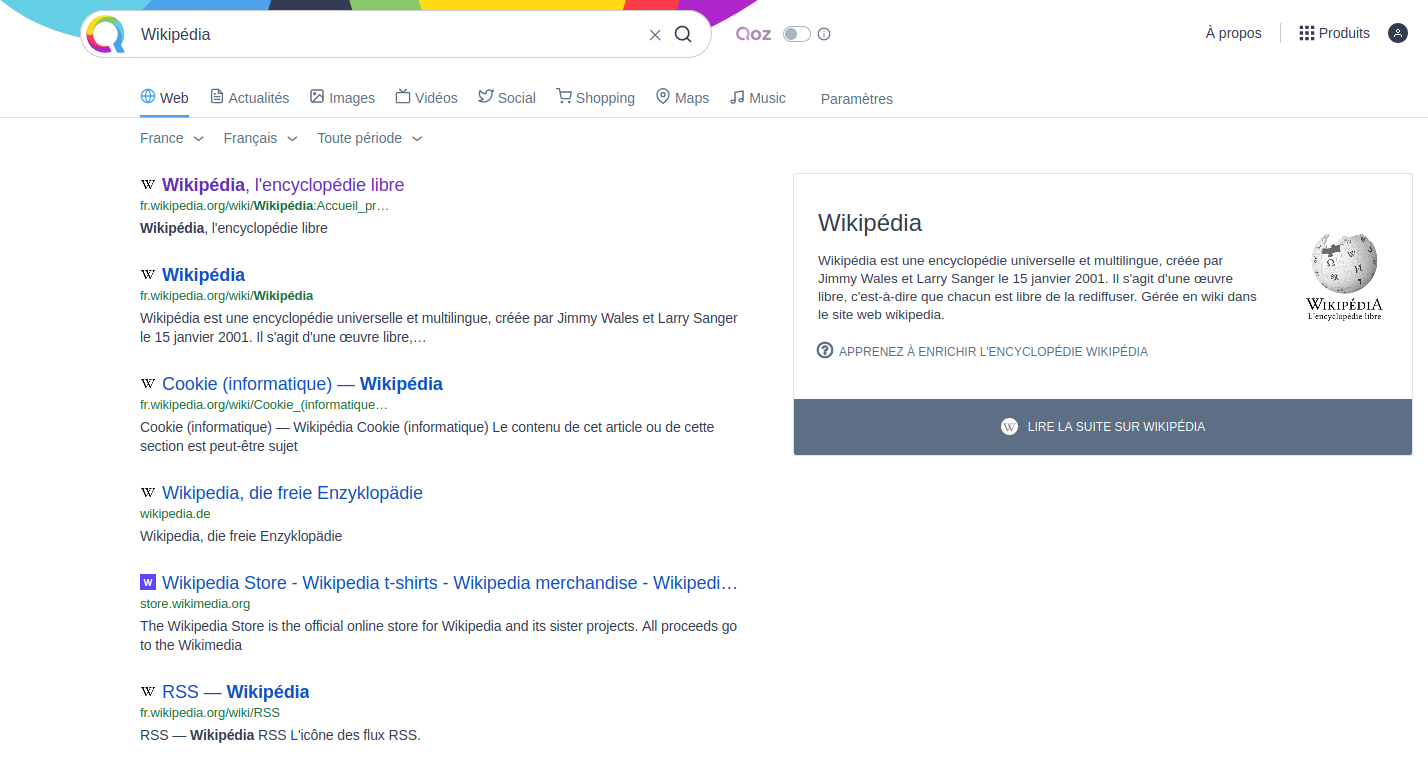

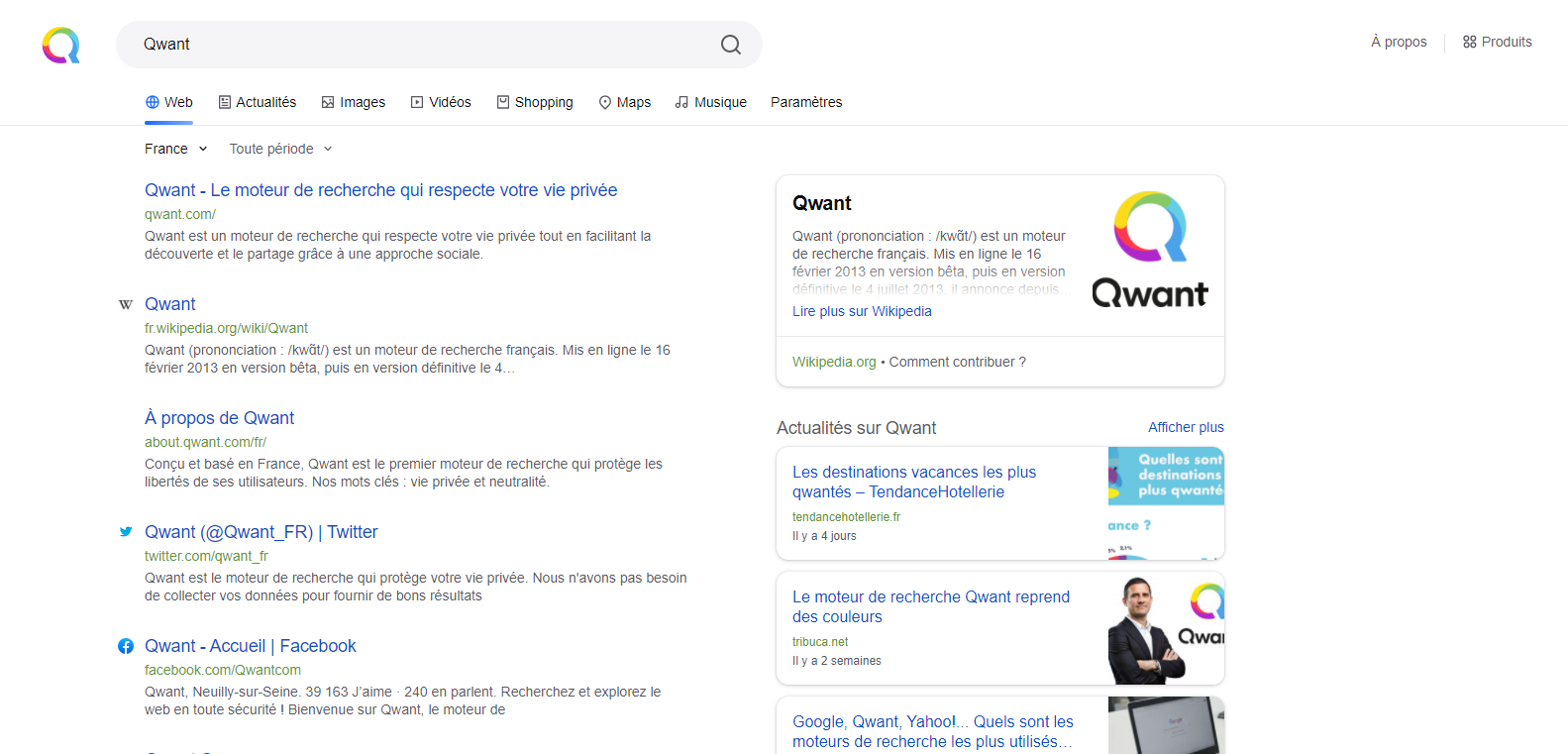

== Features ==
List of Qwant's features
Name	Active?	Description	Active years
Search	Yes	Public search engine	2013 - now
§ Qwant Junior	Yes	Kids search engine	2016 - now
Qwant Pay	No	Payment system	
Qwant Med & Surgery	No	Healthcare service and VR for surgeons	
Qwant Mail	No	Email provider	Never released
Qwant Sports	No	Sports search engine	
Qwant Games	No	Games search engine	
Qwant Sécurité Civile (Civil security)	No	IT system developed with French government	
Qwant Home	No	Unknown solution developed in partnership with hardware companies	
§ Masq by Qwant	No	Zero knowledge solution	2019 - 2020
§ Qwant Causes	No	Search engine funding charitable causes	2019 - 2020
§ Qwant School	No	Like § Qwant Junior but for teens	
§ Qwant Maps	No	Mapping service	2019 - 2024
§ Qwant IoT	No	Open real world data to search engine	2018 - ?
§ Qwant Lite	No	Low-resource consumption version of Qwant	2015 - ?
§ Qwant Music	No	Music search engine	2016 - 2022
§ Qwant VIPrivacy	No	Trackers and cookies blocking browser extension	2022 - ?
§ Qwant@Work	No	Privacy browser extension	2023 - ?
VPN	n/a	VPN	?

== Business model ==
Qwant's business model is partly based on cost-per-click through contextual advertising. It also has partnerships with companies such as TripAdvisor, PagesJaunes and DeepL. These serve to enrich the results, such as by DeepL providing its translation service directly on the Qwant results page. Qwant's results are further augmented by the integration of application programming interfaces (APIs) provided by third-party companies, like Facebook, Twitter and YouTube.

=== Privacy ===
Qwant does not provide search results when cookies are disabled. The only cookies Qwant installs are for core functionality and not for advertising. Local storage is also used to save the search engine's parameters, such as the theme, filtering parameters, and the language.

The results displayed are not customized according to a search history, as with Google, but instead depend on the general trends of the moment. Since mid-2016, Qwant has been sending data to Microsoft Bing Ads to respond to requests—specifically, the IP/24 of the user, the User-Agent of their browser, and the search keywords. These data were not anonymized but pseudonymized. This was done without informed consent of its users. It did not announce this until mid-2021.

== Partnerships ==
=== Mozilla Foundation ===
On 4 July 2016, Qwant announced a global partnership with the Mozilla Foundation. A new version of the Firefox web browser resulted from this partnership, specifically optimized for the use of Qwant. On 2 August 2016, a mobile version was also made available. On this occasion, Qwant said it wanted to reach “5% to 8% market share on the continent by 2018–2019” and "achieve €2.5 million in sales" in 2016. Continuing this partnership, a Qwant app for Android and iOS smartphones was released, based on a fully open source fork of Mozilla Firefox.

Qwant's extension for Mozilla Firefox is on the list of free software recommended by the French State as part of the overall modernization of its information systems. While it is published under MIT/X11 license, the engine itself is not open source.

=== Fairphone ===
Qwant announced that it would be the default search engine in the Fairphone 2 smartphone, after partnering with Fairphone.

=== Inria ===
Qwant partnered with Inria for research on Internet research technologies that respect privacy.

=== Fleksy ===
Qwant entered a partnership that integrated the search engine into the Fleksy virtual keyboard.

=== Villes Internet ===
At the end of August 2018, Qwant created Elunum, a search engine for elected officials and territorial agents. This engine was made in cooperation with Villes Internet.

=== Lexibook ===
In September 2018, Qwant and Lexibook announced the offering of Qwant products (including Qwant Junior) on LexiTab tablets.

=== Brave ===
Qwant became the default search engine for the Brave browser in France and Germany.

=== Qobuz ===
A partnership was signed in 2018 with the music streaming and downloading service Qobuz, allowing CD-quality online listening of tracks recommended by the search engine in France.

=== Wiko ===
On 27 March 2019, a partnership between Qwant and Wiko was announced. Wiko launched a new version of its View 2 Pro with Qwant as its default search engine, becoming the first Android phone to not use Google as the default.

This was a result of the decision of European Competition Commissioner Margrethe Vestager in July 2018 to impose a fine of €4.34 billion on Google for abuse of its dominant position within the Android operating system. See § Google.

=== Easyvoyage ===
Qwant partnered with travel comparison site Easyvoyage to supply results for flight and hotel research.

=== HelloAsso ===
On 14 May 2019, Qwant Causes was launched in partnership with HelloAsso, which was responsible for donations payment.

=== Huawei ===
Huawei chose Qwant as the default search engine on its P40 smartphone in France, Germany, and Italy, in response to US sanctions.

In May 2021, Qwant's CEO asked shareholders for permission to borrow €8 million from Huawei.

=== Samsung ===
On 12 May 2020, Samsung Internet announced a partnership with Qwant to globally deploy the search engine.

=== DeepL ===
Qwant launched the first privacy-friendly translation service on its search engine, in partnership with DeepL. Twenty-eight languages can be translated from the Qwant search page.

=== Ecosia ===
In November 2024, Qwant announced that it had partnered with Ecosia in a joint venture to build the European Search Index, a search index created to provide more localized search results in the French and German languages, and to reduce the reliance on Bing and Google. It also hoped to rank results tailored more to European preferences.

=== Mistral AI ===
Qwant partnered with Mistral AI to develop an AI feature, called "Réponse Flash" (flash response), in 2026. It is meant to summarize information for end users while keeping high accuracy (by using at least two sources), encouraging website visits (by only using 500 characters per source), sharing usage data with press partners and equally sharing revenues (by showing ads in responses). Started in January 2026, the experiment should last 9 months.

=== Waterfox ===
Qwant has been the default search engine of Waterfox since July 2026, following a partnership that led to the browser distancing itself from Yahoo Search. Previously, Waterfox has used Startpage and 1.org as its default search engines. DuckDuckGo is used in countries where Qwant is not available.

== Acquisitions and use of technology ==
=== Xilopix ===
In November 2017, Qwant bought Xilopix, a company based in Lorraine and publisher of the search engine Xaphir, which was experiencing financial difficulties.

=== Nvidia ===
In April 2017, Qwant announced it would be using Nvidia brand supercomputers for deep learning to refine its research results and to rent its computers to startups that needed to use these technologies.

=== Lilo ===
With the goal of gaining more independence from Bing and grow its index, Qwant acquires in May 2025 French charitable metasearch engine Lilo.

== Disputes ==
=== GooL.li ===
A few days after its launch in July 2013, it was accused by the designers of the Canadian search engine GooL.li, launched in 2012, of plagiarizing its interface.

Mohamed Kahlain, co-founder of GooL.li, announced that he did not want to sue Qwant and said that he was not aware of the interface change.

=== Denigration trial against Marc Longo ===
Marc Longo develop and maintain since 1996 multiple websites:

- Annuaire Francais: directory of public and private entities domiciled in France
- Commerce Français: marketplace for french companies with no commission nor intermediary
- Premsgo: search engine indexing only french entities

Following public announcements made by Qwant over the years 2013 to 2019, Longo, publicly and frequently expressed is opinion. He wasn't the only one to express disagreements over Qwant's strategy (§ Dependence on Bing, low transparency, high public funds spendings, ...).
He tried to mediate these issues and raise awareness to Chambre de commerce et d'industrie en France, CDC and AN to no avail.
In March 2019, he mandated an usher to test Qwant's results relevance. One month later, Longo sent a letter to all members of the two chambers of the French republic warning them of the technical weaknesses of the search engine.
Qwant attacked Longo for denigration following its letters. In June of the same year, Longo was found guilty. The ruling reminded that because of his professional activity, Longo was a competitor to Qwant. As such, criticizing Qwant was an act of denigration and not defamation.

=== Google ===
In March 2017, Qwant, through the Open Internet Project (OIP), of which it is a member, accused Google of anti-competitive practices and filed a complaint with the European Commission in Brussels. Google was fined 4.34 billion euros more than one year later.

The OIP had already filed complaints against Google in the past.

=== Microsoft ===
In June 2025, Qwant asked the French antitrust regulator to take interim action against Microsoft as it allegedly worsened the French search engine's results. The complaint was rejected in November of the same year.

== Controversies ==
=== Logo similarity with Google ===
In its early stages, the similarity of its logo with that of Google was pointed out.

=== Privacy approach ===
When launched in February 2013, Qwant did not advertise itself as privacy-focused. Starting with the official launch, in July of the same year, privacy became one of the main selling point of the search engine.

In 2019, France's National Commission on Informatics and Liberty (CNIL) was notified that Qwant wasn't following applying personal data regulation. After auditing the company twice, CNIL statued that data sent to Microsoft couldn't be considered anonymous but rather pseudonymous contrary to what Qwant claimed in its privacy policy. Qwant updated its policy in consequences. In February 2025, CNIL issued a legal reminder to Qwant, stating that it did not fully comply to the previous decision while still noting that the company did improve its privacy policy since 2019.

=== Dependence on Bing ===
Qwant was originally a meta-search engine that presented itself as a search engine. Its founders quickly acknowledged while minimizing the use of Bing and without clearly mentioning the service as required by Bing's API.

In the summer of 2016, in preparation for an audit conducted by the CDC with a view to an entry into the capital of Qwant, a code amendment to reduce the use of the Bing API took place a few days before the audit.

In March 2017, according to La Lettre, the investment bank Bpifrance refused to participate in the raising of funds due to concerns about Qwant's use of technologies provided by Microsoft and servers at Huawei. Éric Léandri confirmed the use of results from Microsoft's search engine, Bing, to supplement the results generated by the Qwant algorithm, as well as the use of Bing's advertising department. He questioned Bpifrance's decision by insinuating it didn't read Qwant proposal.

However, in 2019, audits from DINUM led to explain the dependence on Bing, and even seek to measure it. Between July and September of that year, the percentage of request answered using Bing went from 75% to 65%.

In 2020, Qwant claimed to have exceeded 50% of independent results for web searches, and 70% for all research.

During a Bing API outage in 2024, Qwant stopped showing results.

=== Miscellaneous ===
In July 2019, La Lettre (disambiguation) revealed that Qwant had been questioned by its main shareholder (CDC) on Qwant's twenty highest salaries; the letter talks about wages that are “manifestly indecent”.

=== Management ===
In September 2019, During Éric Léandri's time as CEO, the toxic work environment inside the company directly linked to him was revealed. It's also at that time that Éric Léandri threatened journalists.

== Active services ==
=== Qwant Junior ===
Qwant Junior is a search engine for children aged 6–12 with no advertising, e-commerce and NSFW elements. Since 2018, it is available on Android and iOS mobile devices.

It launched experimentally in several French schools in January 2015, in partnership with the French National Education, and was released as a final version in February 2015.

Since March 2023, Qwant Junior has partnered with the BayaM app, designed by publishers Bayard Jeunesse and Milan, to offer educational content to children aged 6–12.

== Discontinued services ==
Following multiple restructuring and management team changes, the following services were discontinued.

=== Masq by Qwant ===
Masq by Qwant was a personal data storage service designed to personalize Qwant's service to users without collecting personal data. It was initially released as an alpha version on 27 June 2019 and later discontinued on 17 September 2020, because it "does not meet the expectations of most users".

=== Qwant Causes ===
Qwant unveiled Qwant Causes at the Mobile World Congress in Barcelona, from 25–28 February 2019. Similar in concept to Lilo and Ecosia, it was a search engine that allowed funding a project while conducting searches respecting the privacy of the users of not wishing to create an account. The service was launched in partnership with HelloAsso, which offered its beneficiary associations to benefit from the service. On the results pages of a query, more advertisements were displayed to fund these associations of general interest, without impacting Qwant's revenue.

The service was discontinued on 30 April 2020, because of "insufficient use of societal and associative issues addressed".

=== Qwant School ===
Qwant School was a filtered version of the Qwant search engine designed for teens, especially middle school students.

Like § Qwant Junior, it did not display any advertising, online commerce links, or any violent or pornographic content to be displayed, although its filters were otherwise somewhat less restrictive

=== Qwant Maps ===
Qwant Maps mapping service, based on OpenStreetMap, was released in alpha version on 4 December 2018.

The service went into beta on 27 June 2019, and came out in a final version in 2021.

Qwant Maps had most of the features of a classic online map, namely finding routes (by car, on foot, by bike, and by public transport), and places of interest (services, shops, and activities).

On 20 May 2024, Qwant announced on X that they were discontinuing Qwant Maps, replacing it with a "Maps module" integrated into the engine.

=== Qwant IoT ===
At VivaTech in May 2018, Qwant announced Qwant loT, the development of a search engine for the Internet of Things, in partnership with Kuzzle.

=== Qwant Lite ===
On 5 October 2015, Qwant unveiled a Lite version of its search engine, intended for older browsers, aging terminals, and low-speed Internet connections.

This streamlined version of the website did not use JavaScript or CSS3, technologies deemed too resource-consuming.

=== Qwant Music ===
Qwant Music is a search engine for albums and artists developed in collaboration with Ircam and Qobuz.

On 3 June 2016, the beta version of Qwant Music is launched, enabling searching for artists, albums and titles.

In September 2017, Qwant Music was detached as a subsidiary based in Ajaccio, Corsica.

On 8 June 2018, the final version of Qwant Music was released.

=== Qwant VIPrivacy ===
Qwant VIPrivacy is a browser extension for blocking trackers and cookies when browsing the internet, while using Qwant as the browser's default search engine.

=== Qwant@Work ===
Launched in January 2023, Qwant@Work is a service dedicated to businesses, administrations, and organizations, enabling them to protect the navigation of their employees by limiting the collection of personal data.
The extension installs Qwant as the default search engine.

== Reception ==
France's Minister of Economics Emmanuel Macron called Qwant the "French Google" in 2015.

In 2024, WIRED wrote that Qwant, partnered with Ecosia, could hope to succeed like Naver, which has over 50% market share in South Korea by capitalizing on Google's results becoming less useful.

== Privacy advocacy ==
In September 2021, Qwant became available in all European countries and made it to the top 5 search engines available on Android phones. The European Commission signed the "choice screen" on Android phones teams in June 2021, and Qwant contributed to the passage of this resolution.

On 25 November 2021, Qwant publicly announced its contribution to the development of the "Manifesto of French startups" by the association France Digitale, intending to bring concrete proposals related to digital for the 2022 presidential election.

In January 2023, for Data Privacy Day, Qwant released the first edition of its online privacy barometer alongside Proton, Murena and Olvid.

== See also ==
- Timeline of web search engines
- List of search engines
- Startpage
- 2025 United States boycott
