= Gaia-X =

Data infrastructure development project

Gaia-X is a European initiative launched by the governments of Germany and France in 2019 to develop a federated framework for cloud services and data infrastructures based on common requirements for interoperability, transparency, data control and compliance. The initiative subsequently developed into Gaia-X AISBL, a Belgian international non-profit association bringing together cloud providers, technology companies, users and research organisations.

It was developed to help ensure European digital sovereignty. It has moved past the development stage and is now being implemented. It promotes interoperability and data sovereignty across Europe and elsewhere. It provides a framework and tools digital governance to ensure data can be shared securely while complying with European values of transparency, openness, data protection, and security, which can be applied to cloud technologies to obtain transparency and controllability across data and services. The project name is a reference to the Greek goddess Gaia.

Gaia-X started as an initiative by the former German Minister of Economic Affairs, Peter Altmaier, and his French counterpart, Bruno Le Maire, in 2019. Originally presented at the 2019 Digital Summit in Dortmund, Germany, the initiative is under the von der Leyen Commission of European strategic autonomy and is under continuous development. The initiative is based in Belgium and has the legal form of an international non-profit organization (AISBL). It aims to develop a proposal for the next generation of data infrastructure for Europe, and promote the digital sovereignty of European users of cloud services.

== Goals ==
The aim of Gaia-X is to foster digital sovereignty aligned with European values.

To do so, Gaia-X is supporting ecosystems where data can be exchanged in a trustworthy way and owners keep sovereignty over their data, thus easing the growth of data economy.

To do so, Gaia-X has released standards, rules and a verification framework to enable transparent environments to spread for data exchanges.

According to the German Federal Ministry of Economics and Energy (BMWi), openness, transparency and European connectivity are central to Gaia-X. The stated goal of this digital ecosystem is to ensure that companies and business models from Europe can be competitive, and share data within a trustworthy environment.

Gaia-X's objective is not to become a Cloud service provider or a Cloud management platform or to compete with hyperscalers.

== Solutions ==
The project combines existing central and decentralized infrastructures to form a "digital ecosystem" using secure, open technologies with clearly identifiable Gaia-X nodes. The ecosystem includes software components from a common repository, and standards based on relevant EU regulations. Gaia-X intends to offer significant benefits from a data and infrastructure perspective, including innovative cross-sector data cooperation and more transparent business models.

== Deliverables ==
Gaia-X AISBL is responsible for the following deliverables:

- Specifications describing Gaia-X functional and technical requirements
- Code, provided by the Gaia-X Open Source Software Community, translating the forementioned specifications
- Labels certifying compliance to the governance rules written in the specifications

=== Specifications ===
Gaia-X provides the following specifications to describe Gaia-X concepts:

- The Gaia-X Architecture Document explains concepts and requirements for technical and syntaxical interoperability - no link with governance rules
- The Gaia-X Compliance Document expresses all the rules to follow to enable organisational and semantical interoperability - no link with technical requirements
- The Gaia-X Identity, Credentials and Access Management Document specifies how to deal with rights, authentication and access when interacting with a Gaia-X Ecosystem
- The Gaia-X Data Exchange Document explains process and rules for data exchanges in the Gaia-X world.

The Architecture Document outlines what needs to be built and how the pieces conceptually fit together. The Compliance Document defines the rules and criteria that govern the behaviour of those pieces and their participants.

=== Code ===
Gaia-X specifications are turned into code by the Gaia-X Open Source Software community.

This code is an example of implementation of Gaia-X concepts and rules, creating software modules.

Two versions of these components are available so far:

- Version 1 named TAGUS
- Version 2 named LOIRE - current version of Loire 25.03

== Policy rules, compliance framework and Labels ==
=== Policy Rules ===
The Gaia-X Policy Rules turn the initiative's principles into requirements that participants and service offerings must meet. They cover contractual transparency, data protection, cybersecurity, portability, sustainibility and, at the higher levels of assurance, European control over data processing and access. Gaia-X did not set out to build a separate regulatory system: wherever existing legislation, standards, certifications or industry codes of conduct could already show that a requirement had been met, the rules point to them (named Permissible Standards).. The first version of were published in June 2020, and did not yet include sustainability nor a separate section for European Sovereignty provisions.

The Policy Rules Committee oversee the drafting, and several versions went out to public consultation. At the consultation on version 21.04 in May 2021, the committee was represented by its chair, Ulrich Eichhorn, and its co-chair, Alban Schmutz. Schmutz, who sat for the cloud providers' association CISPE, later chaired the committee.

The rules were gradually turned into criteria that could be verified in practice. The 2022 Policy Rules and Labelling Document grouped them under a contractual framework, data protection, cybersecurity, portability and European control, and mapped each requirement to existing schemes — depending on the criterion, ISO27001, France's SecNumCloud, German's C5, the CISPE Data Protection Code of Conduct, the EU Cloud Code of Conduct or the SWIPO codes on cloud portability or the Climate Neutral Data Centre Pact. The EUCS (cloud computing) certification scheme in development under the Cybersecurity Act is also referenced since 2020 for cybersecurity provisions. Compliance is compositional: a certification or code of conduct a provider already held could serve as evidence for a given Gaia-X criterion, rather than each requirement being assessed again through a separate Gaia-X mechanism.

=== Labelling framework ===
Gaia-X then added a labelling framework to distinguish service offerings by level of assurance. Three levels were defined at the outset, each demanding more than the last on transparency, autonomy, data protection, security, interoperability, portability and European control. Part of the criteria rested on self-assessment and part on evidence drawn from recognised standards; the more demanding requirements, and the higher levels, called for assessment by a conformity assessment body. Here too, existing certifications and codes of conduct could be reused rather than duplicated.

The labels were tied to the Gaia-X Trust Framework, which described participants and service offerings through machine-readable self-descriptions, signed cryptographically and expressed as W3C Verifiable Credentials, so that compliance claims could be checked automatically.

=== Evolution into the Compliance Document ===
The documentation went through several rounds. The original Policy Rules Document gave way to the Policy Rules and Labelling Document, which sat alongside a separate Trust Framework. In 2024 the two were merged into a Policy Rules Conformity Document, soon renamed the Gaia-X Compliance Document. According to Gaia-X, both earlier texts ceased to be normative deliverables in their own right once the Compliance Document appeared.

The framework now sets a baseline scheme, Gaia-X Standard Compliance, against three optional labels. Standard Compliance is the minimum for taking part in the ecosystem, while Labels 1 to 3 add successively stricter requirements and stronger assurance mechanisms. Labels 2 and 3 require manual verification by a conformity assessment body, and Label 3 also requires the provider's headquarters to be in the European Union.

A label is issued for a particular service offering once it has been validated against the relevant scheme. Technically it is a signed, machine-readable W3C Verifiable Credential naming the participant, the service offering, the assessment scheme applied, the issuer, the date of issue and the period of validity.

In November 2022, the first batch of 176 compliant service were released by CISPE members.. In June 2025, the first suite for Gaia-X compliance has been released. In November 2025, the CISPE-operated catalogue developed by CDE presented at the Gaia-X Summit in Porto contained more than 600 services from 15 providers. Five providers — Cloud Temple, Thésée DataCenter, Opiquad, OVHcloud and Seeweb — were the first to offer services with the Gaia-X Label Level 3.

== Use cases ==
Live use cases demonstrate how Gaia-X concepts ease data space management or data exchange. Gaia‑X is in its implementation phase, with more than 180 data spaces.

=== Lighthouse Data Spaces ===
Some data spaces are recognised by the Gaia-X AISBL as the best examples to showcase how Gaia-X concepts can foster European data sovereignty and value creation.

These data spaces span across diverse sectors such as the automotive, aeronautics and space or manufacturing industry, but also cloud services.

=== Lighthouse Projects ===
Lighthouse Projects aims to create data exchange platforms based on transparency, trust and openness. Many sectors are targeted, like agriculture, mobility, industry, health, energy or finance.

This projects are the frontrunners towards setting up trust for data exchanges and data services thanks to use of the Gaia-X Trust Framework

=== Use case testimonials ===
Some testimonials are also published by the Gaia-X AISBL to better understand how Gaia-X Concepts are enabling secure and trustworthy data exchanges, thanks to down-to-earth examples.

These examples, spanning from road condition monitoring, to perfect component fit within the manufacturing industry, are the following ones:

- TAMIS in TEMS : basis for a data hub for the audiovisual industry
- MERLOT : smart tool for student career management
- X-ROAD : platform for data space creation
- Digital Road Condition monitoring : proactive tool for road maintenance
- Ideal Component Matching : ensuring components are matched accurately.
- French-Korean Professional Mobility Tool : career management tool for Korean professionals looking for opportunities in France.

== Gaia-X Digital Clearing Houses ==
Gaia-X Digital Clearing Houses are the entry point where participants or data services can be automatically scanned regarding Gaia-X conformity rules.

They are organised in a network of nodes and are running the technical Gaia-X components linked to Gaia-X Conformity (Gaia-X Registry or Gaia-X Compliance engine for example), as expressed in the Gaia-X Specifications.

Thus, calling one of the Gaia-X Digital Clearing House is the practical way to determine your eligibility to the Gaia-X Conformity rules.

All the Gaia-X Digital Clearing Houses are interconnected, and can be reached independently.

The list of active Gaia-X Digital Clearing Houses, including the version of code they are running for each component, is provided on a portal powered by Gaia-X AISBL.

== Organisation ==
=== The association: Gaia-X AISBL ===
Gaia-X AISBL was established early 2021 as an international private non-profit association under Belgian law (French: Association Internationale Sans But Lucratif, short: AISBL) and headquartered in Brussels.

Gaia-X AISBL is funded by the annual fees from its 250 members (private companies, associations, or universities for example).

Its General Assembly, where all the members of the association have a seat, has full authority to ensure that Gaia-X AISBL goals are reached.

A Board of Directors, elected every 2 years, decided on important matters on behalf of all members and for the Association.

The Management Team of the Association is composed of the Chief Executive Officer (CEO), the Chief Operating Officer (COO), the Chief Strategy Officer (CSO), the Chief Technical Officer (CTO), the Chief Innovation Officer (CINO), the Chief Financial Officer (CFO), and the Digital Communications Director. It runs the daily activities of the Association.

=== Committees and Working Groups ===
To be able to work on the several subjects in Gaia-X AISBL scope, tasks has been dispatched between operational committees and working groups:

- The Data and Services Business Committee aims to collect and share business information linked to Gaia-X in order to speed up market adoption. It is powered by the Sounding Boards dealing with local hubs, industrial domains or ITC service providers.
- The Policy Rules Committee aims to translate Gaia-X principles (transparency, data protection, cybersecurity, portability, openness) into rules and objectives in order to add value to the ecosystems using them. This committee is organised in sprints.
- The Technical Committee designs and implements the technological vision about Gaia-X. Some working groups have been set up to deal with architecture, data exchange services, or identity, credentials and access management.

The access to these committees and working groups are mainly dedicated to Gaia-X AISBL members, enabling them to shape the future of data exchange and data services.

=== Origin ===
The Gaia-X AISBL has been created at the beginning of 2021 by 11 French organisations and 11 German organisations. The founding members on the German side included:

- Beckhoff Automation
- BMW
- Bosch
- DE-CIX
- Deutsche Telekom
- German Edge Cloud
- PlusServer
- SAP
- Siemens

The Fraunhofer Gesellschaft, the International Data Spaces Association, and the European cloud provider association CISPE were co-founders of the Gaia-X Association.

On the French side, founding members included:

- Amadeus
- Atos
- Docaposte
- Électricité de France (EDF)
- Institut Mines-Télécom (IMT)
- Orange
- Outscale
- OVHcloud
- Safran
- Scaleway

Since then, the number of members grew constantly, enabling the association to cover all its costs thanks to the membership fees.

The Association is also involved in a project founded by the European Commission. This project, the Data Space Support Center (DSSC) has been launched in 2022 for 42 months.

== Communities ==
=== Gaia-X Ecosystems ===
Gaia-X Ecosystems are portals to discover Gaia-X but also to get in touch with organisations and companies aiming to produce solution for data and interoperable data spaces. These ecosystems are gathering several profiles (business, industry, researchers, etc.) but all targeting one dedicated topic or domain, such as health or agriculture for example.

=== Gaia-X Hubs ===
Gaia-X Hubs are a network of local entry point in each countries. They are not part of the Gaia-X AISBL, but work closely with it as a lab for Gaia-X Projects, sharing use cases, knowledge, skills and resources.

=== Open Source Community ===
The Gaia-X AISBL relies on its Open Source Software Community, playing a key role in the development of the code released.

This code can be used by everyone, but also contributions and ideas are welcome as well.

== Implementation ==
The planned architecture was described in a June 2020 publication. On 12 January 2021, the Laboratory for Machine Tools and Production Engineering (WZL) of RWTH Aachen University in Germany announced the implementation of a secure, decentralized, IoT data space based on the Gaia-X model. A total of 4 locations were connected, one by Fraunhofer IPT.

Senseering, WZL, Fraunhofer IPT, and Fraunhofer FIT were planning to establish a state-wide Gaia-X compliant IoT data space for the German federal state of North Rhine-Westphalia (NRW), the DataMarketPlace.NRW.

== Political support ==
The then German Federal Minister of Economic Affairs and Energy, Peter Altmaier, supported by the French Minister of Economy and Finance Bruno Le Maire, initiated Gaia-X as a project during the summer of 2019. They issued a common press release in October 2019, and a first Franco-German Position Paper followed on 18 February 2020.

A specific joined press conference took place, with both Altmaier and Le Maire, in June 2020 (source: programme), including the announcement, by the 22 Founding Members, of the Gaia-X Association AISBL. That announcement achieved broad press coverage: Reuters, AFP, Politico, El Pais, Les Echos, Business Insider, TagesSpiegel, and Europe1.

In September 2020, Ursula von der Leyen, the President of the European Commission, mentioned Gaia-X in her first State of the Union Address in front of the European Parliament, as a key building block of the European Digital Strategy.

Will Hutton, writing in The Guardian in October 2020, indicated Gaia‑X is part of a wider strategy to tackle the abuse of personal privacy and monopoly status by US‑based tech giants.

== Controversies ==
Early in the Gaia-X project, open source software advocates warned against corporate capture of Gaia-X by large companies. They referred to Gaia-X as a possible Trojan horse of big tech in Europe, and made comparisons to the French State-sponsored cloud project Andromeda that had been launched 10 years earlier and which resulted in public funds benefiting large non-European industry players.

In November 2021, the French cloud provider Scaleway, one of the founding members of Gaia-X, announced it was leaving the association. Other participants expressed doubts about the initiative's net benefits.

Gaia-X has registered delays in its implementation due to infighting between its corporate members. Participants from companies and government have expressed disappointment with the project.

== See also ==
- Global Partnership on Artificial Intelligence
- Strategic autonomy
