= SecNumCloud =

French cybersecurity qualification for cloud computing services

SecNumCloud is a French cybersecurity qualification for cloud computing services, awarded by the Agence nationale de la sécurité des systèmes d'information (ANSSI), France's national cybersecurity agency. It applies to a specific cloud service, not to a provider as a whole, and can cover Infrastructure as a service (IaaS), Platform as a service (PaaS), Software as a service (SaaS) and container services.

Version 3.2, published in March 2022, combines technical and organisational security controls with requirements intended to limit exposure to non-European extraterritorial regulations. These include rules on the provider's establishment, ownership and operational autonomy.

SecNumCloud grew out of the Secure Cloud proposal developed under France's Cloud Computing industrial plan. ANSSI tested an initial framework in 2014, published the first applicable SecNumCloud version in December 2016 and awarded the first qualification in January 2019. It remains a French qualification, but its requirements now also play a regulatory role for some sensitive public-sector cloud uses.

== History ==
=== Origins ===
SecNumCloud traces its origins to the Cloud Computing plan of the Nouvelle France industrielle, launched in 2013. The plan was led by Thierry Breton, then chief executive of Atos, and Octave Klaba, founder of OVH. In April 2014, Breton told a Senate committee that one of the plan's main conclusions was the creation of a secure cloud label, which he compared to a licence to operate.

Alban Schmutz, then SVP for development and public affairs at OVH, was also involved in this work. At a National Assembly hearing in July 2014, he described ten lines of proposals defined within the Cloud plan and said that concrete proposals had been submitted earlier that year to economy minister Arnaud Montebourg.

Cybersecurity was covered by a separate plan within the same industrial programme. Guillaume Poupard, appointed director-general of ANSSI in 2014, was its project leader. During the same period, ANSSI tested the first Secure Cloud requirements under operating conditions before reworking the framework with cloud providers and evaluation bodies.

Version history of the requirements framework
Version	Date	Main development
1.3	30 July 2014	Initial framework published for comment
2.0	20 March 2015	Experimental Secure Cloud version
3.0	8 December 2016	First applicable SecNumCloud version
3.1	11 June 2018	Revised framework
3.2	8 March 2022	Stronger protection from non-European law

The first qualification was awarded to Oodrive in January 2019 for three SaaS services. 3DS Outscale followed in December 2019 with the first qualified IaaS offering. OVHcloud's Hosted Private Cloud was qualified in January 2021.

== Qualification and requirements ==
SecNumCloud covers security governance, personnel and physical security, access management, cryptography, network and operational security, incident management, business continuity, subcontracting and contractual controls.

The qualification is limited to the service that has actually been assessed. An application running on qualified infrastructure does not automatically inherit the qualification. ANSSI also allows qualification by composition, so controls already assessed in an underlying qualified service can be reused when another service is evaluated. A qualification is valid for up to three years, with annual surveillance.

Version 3.2 introduced specific restrictions on non-EU control. The provider must be established in an EU member state. A single non-EU entity may not hold more than 24% of its capital or voting rights, while non-EU entities collectively may not exceed 39%. Other forms of decisive control, including certain veto rights, are also restricted.

== French public policy ==
The 2021 cloud au centre doctrine made cloud computing the default approach for new state digital services while requiring stronger safeguards for particularly sensitive information. Article 31 of the 2024 SREN Act placed part of this policy on a statutory basis.

Decree No. 2026-272 of 14 April 2026 set out its implementation. An order of 12 August 2026 then approved SecNumCloud 3.2 as the relevant requirements framework. Compliance can also be demonstrated through an EU or EEA certification recognised by ANSSI as equivalent.

== European initiatives ==
Franco-German work started before SecNumCloud was formally launched. At the 2015 International Cybersecurity Forum, French Secretary of State for Digital Affairs Axelle Lemaire announced work on a Franco-German secure-cloud area of trust. At the same event, Poupard described closer cybersecurity cooperation between France and Germany.

In December 2016, ANSSI and Germany's BSI presented European Secure Cloud (ESCloud), a set of fifteen common rules drawing on SecNumCloud and Germany's C5 catalogue. ESCloud did not become an EU-wide certification scheme.

Under the 2019 EU Cybersecurity Act, ENISA began developing the European Cybersecurity Certification Scheme for Cloud Services (EUCS). ANSSI states that France has contributed SecNumCloud criteria to this work since 2019, while ENISA's 2020 candidate scheme drew on both SecNumCloud and C5. A March 2024 draft removed the main sovereignty requirements. as of August 2026, EUCS remained under development. The Commission's 2026 Cloud and AI Development Act proposal separately provides for national schemes to be used until a European cloud scheme is available.

Gaia-X follows a different route. Its Level 3 European Control criteria cite SecNumCloud section 19.6, including 19.6(d), for European establishment and operational autonomy. Sections 19.1 and 19.2 are referenced for EU/EEA data-location requirements. Gaia-X remains a separate compliance framework rather than an extension of the ANSSI qualification.

== Reception ==
The Cours des Comptes described SecNumCloud as demanding and potentially costly. It counted 360 distinct requirements across fourteen areas and a four-stage qualification process, and reported estimates of €1–2 million in investment over about eighteen months. The report noted that this could be a barrier for smaller providers. It also cited estimates of a 25–40% price premium for qualified offerings compared with non-qualified services from the same provider.

In January 2026, ANSSI director-general Vincent Strubel also pointed to the limits of the qualification. European cloud operators still depend on hardware, software and updates that are not wholly controlled in Europe, he noted, meaning that protection from third-country interference cannot be absolute.

== See also ==
- Cloud computing security
- Digital sovereignty
- Gaia-X
- European Cybersecurity Certification Scheme for Cloud Services
