= Ecosia =

Web search engine and browser

- Website type: Search engine and web browser
- Available in: English and 46 other languages
- Headquarters: Berlin, Germany
- CEO: Christian Kroll
- Revenue: 43.2M€ (2025)
- Website: www.ecosia.org
- Commercial: Yes
- Users: >20 million
- Launched: Search engine: December 7, 2009 Web browser: April 22, 2024
- Current status: Active

Ecosia is a search engine and web browser whose profits are used to pursue environmental goals. Ecosia's search results are provided by its own search index, Staan, developed by the co-founded European Search Perspective (EUSP), as well as Google and Microsoft Bing; thus, Ecosia is partly a proxy search engine. In 2025, Ecosia had a global market share of 0.10-0.15%.

The operating company, Ecosia GmbH, was founded in 2009 and has its headquarters in Berlin.

== Services ==
=== Ecosia ===
Ecosia has historically delivered a combination of search results from Google, Bing and Wikipedia. As of 2023, it sources its search results predominantly from Google. In 2024, Ecosia started building an independent European search index as a joint venture with Qwant, and as of August 2025 user queries are being partially fulfilled by the new index.

Advertisements are delivered by Yahoo! and Microsoft Advertising as part of a revenue sharing agreement with the company.

=== Ecosia Chat ===
Ecosia Chat is an AI chatbot powered by OpenAI's API which features a unique "green answers" option. They switched to a small Mistral model in May 2026.

=== Ecosia Browser ===
The Ecosia Browser is a proprietary web browser based on Chromium, launched in 2024. The browser has a built-in ad blocker, AI chatbot, and a climate pledge rating that assess a company's pledges on environmental sustainability. Ecosia has also committed to producing 25Wh of renewable energy for each day that a user browses with the browser.

=== Former services ===
Freetree, launched in 2022, was a browser extension that used commission from online shopping to plant trees. Ecosia announced in June 2025 that it was shutting Freetree because it "never reached enough users to scale sustainably".

=== Financial Reports ===
Ecosia keeps its Financial Reports public, saying, "We're all about transparency. That's why we publish monthly financial reports to keep you in the loop on our latest tree planting and climate impact projects. Our investments in search diversity. And how much money we made and how we spent it. "

=== Privacy ===
Ecosia states in its privacy policy that it does not create personal profiles based on search history or use external tracking tools. The IP address and search queries of the user are given to either Microsoft Bing or Google to "provide search results and ads" and to "prevent bot attacks and frauds". Additionally, Ecosia shares the user's IP address with Tripadvisor and Wikimedia when images from those services are displayed.

For the Ecosia Chat feature, Ecosia retains queries to improve its service but does not store personal information. They do not share personal data with OpenAI; however, any information shared during chats is sent to OpenAI. Although the data from these chats will not be used to train OpenAI's models, chat data is stored in OpenAI's database for up to 30 days to allow access for issue resolution and conversation recovery.

In August 2025, Ecosia began to provide search results to French users from its new Europe-based index, developed jointly with French search engine Qwant.

== Business model ==
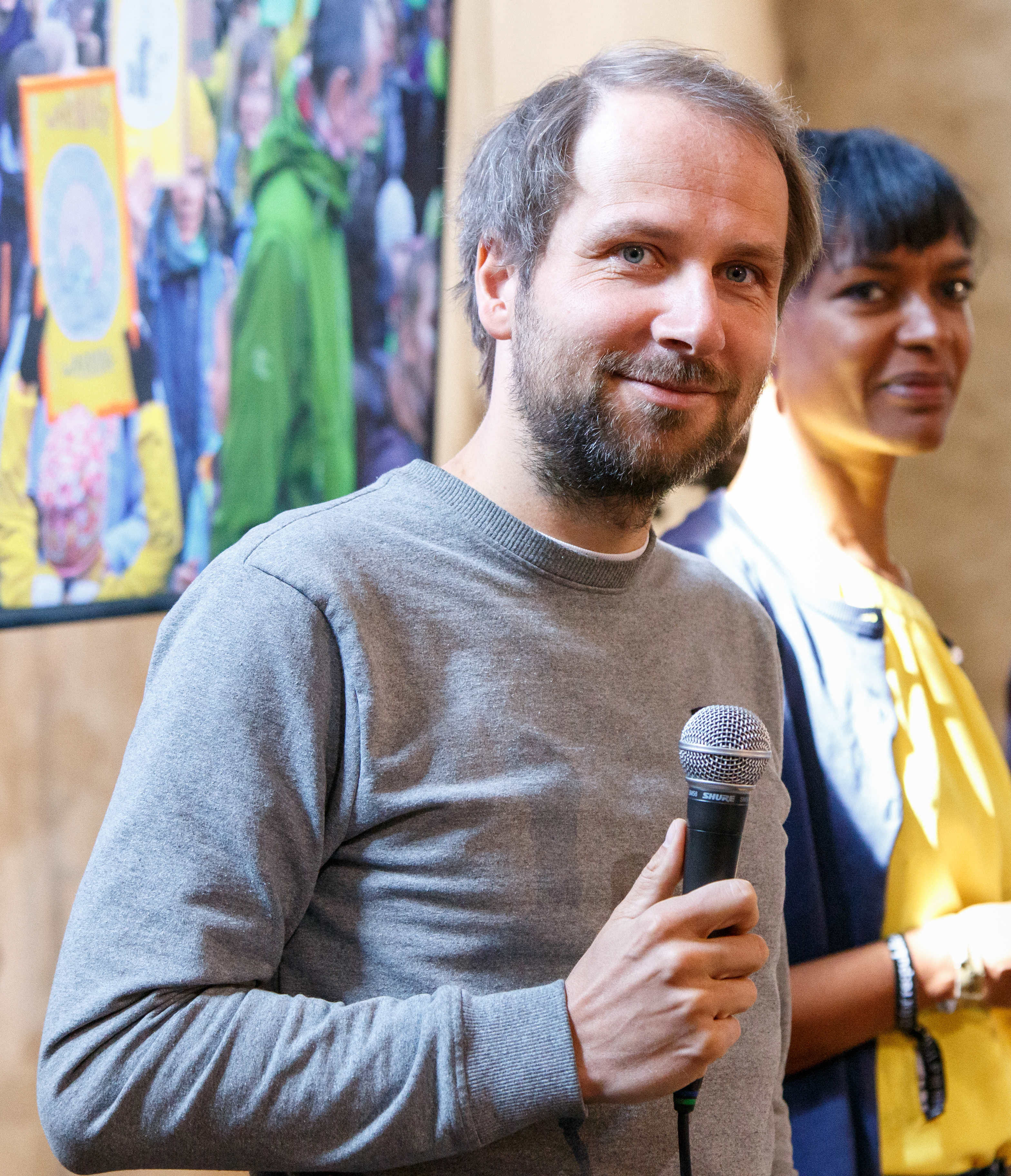
Christian Kroll, founder of Ecosia, in 2019

The company uses renewable energy to power its servers and invests in other climate initiatives, aiming to absorb more CO_{2} than it emits.

In October 2018, founder Christian Kroll announced he had given some of his shares to the Purpose Foundation. As a result, Kroll and Ecosia co-owner Tim Schumacher gave up their right to sell Ecosia or take any profits out of the company.

== Partnerships ==
=== Microsoft ===
Ecosia has a long-standing relationship with Microsoft to keep its investment in infrastructure small, through the use of Bing's existing implementation and an ad revenue sharing agreement.

=== TreeCard ===
In October 2020, Ecosia announced it had bought a 20% stake in the debit card company TreeCard. Cards produced by TreeCard are made of British cherry wood instead of the customary plastics found in most other debit cards. It planned to launch a new debit card in 2021, in partnership with Mastercard. Ecosia intended to send 80% of its profits from the card to global reforestation projects.

=== Qwant ===
In November 2024, Ecosia announced that it had partnered with Qwant in a joint-venture to build the European Search Index, a search index created to provide more localised search results in the French and German languages, and to reduce the reliance on Bing and Google.

== Impact ==
=== On internet search ===
Map of countries where Ecosia is planting trees as of 2021

Ecosia, in 2021, claimed that each search removes 1 kg of CO_{2} from the atmosphere.

In January 2023, Ecosia handled 0.29% of European search requests, behind DuckDuckGo's 0.53%, Bing's 3.65%, and Google's 92.23%. As of 2024, Ecosia has handled 0.30% of European search requests and 0.09% of global search requests.

=== On ESG ===
In 2017, it built its first solar plant.

From 2019 to 2021, Ecosia used 80% of its profits from advertising revenue to support tree-planting projects. This made up 47.1% of its income.

Ecosia is B Lab certified, having met its standards of accountability, sustainability, and performance. The company has been certified since April 2014, becoming the first German company to receive the certification.

=== On tree-planting ===
By July 2020, Ecosia had surpassed 100 million trees planted in total. By June 2022, Ecosia had passed 150 million trees planted. By 2025, Ecosia had achieved its original goal of planting 230 million trees. Ecosia decided to diversify its climate investments beyond tree planting to areas like climate technology, renewable energy and protecting biodiversity.

Ecosia devotes 80% of its profits to tree planting.

In 2023, Ecosia also set up an incubator for regenerative agriculture, invested into climate technology solutions and diversified their search providers for an improved search experience.

In 2024, new tree planting work was started in Togo, Madagascar, Vietnam and the Netherlands; other works also included rewetting dried peatlands in Germany and creating firebreaks in southern France.

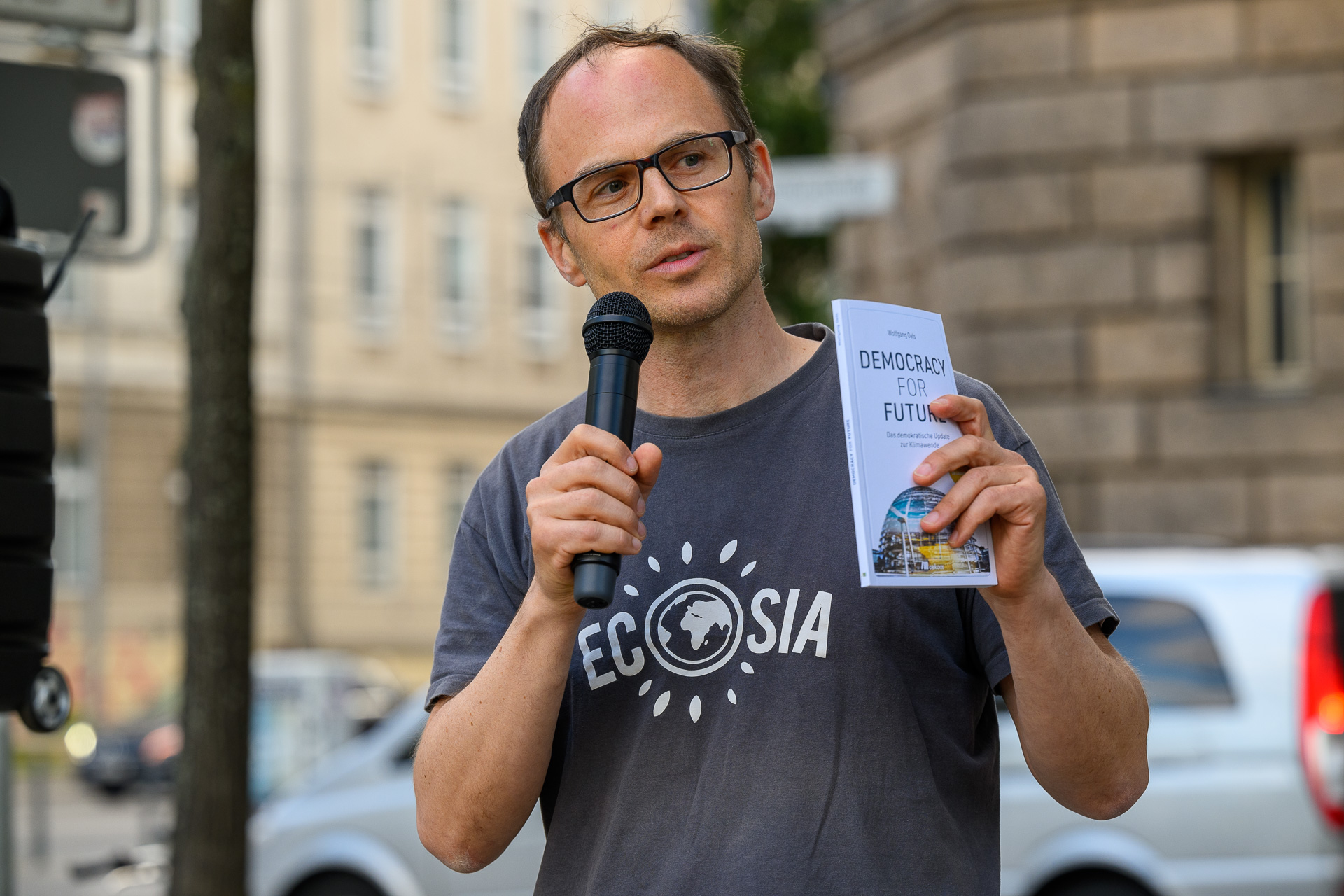
Wolfgang Oels, chief operating officer of Ecosia, speaking at the KlimaAfterWork event in 2022

== Availability ==
Ecosia can be used on any web browser from ecosia.org. Web browsers can also be configured to use the search engine from a built-in user interface without having to load a web page first.

Ecosia can be made the default built-in search engine on Google Chrome, Firefox, Safari, Microsoft Edge, and other browsers by downloading the extension from the Chrome Web Store or Mozilla's Add-on site, among others. In Mobile phones, Ecosia has its own Chromium-based web browser app in Google Play Store and App Store.

As of 26 January 2016, with its version 26 release, the Pale Moon web browser has included Ecosia as a built-in search engine option, as has the Polarity web browser since its release in 15 February 2016. Ecosia was also briefly the default search engine of the Waterfox web browser starting with version 44.0.2. Vivaldi has included Ecosia as a default search engine option since its version 1.9 release. In March 2018, Firefox 59.0 added Ecosia as a search engine option for the German version.

As of 12 March 2020, Ecosia was included as a default search engine option for Google Chrome in 47 markets, the first time a not-for-profit search engine appeared as a choice for users. On 14 December 2020, Apple's Safari web browser added Ecosia as a search engine option in macOS Big Sur 11.1 and iOS/iPadOS 14.3. On 28 January 2021, Ecosia became an official search engine on the Brave browser as a result of a partnership announced that day by both companies.

On 12 August 2019, Ecosia announced it would not participate in the "search-choice" auction to appear on Android devices led by Google. This meant that in 2020, European Android phone users did not have the option to set Ecosia as a default search engine.

On 22 April 2024, Ecosia launched its own Chromium-based web browser for desktop users. The company also started to promote affiliate links to collect revenue from user purchases on sites such as Amazon.

On 17 December 2024, Mozilla announced their partnership with Ecosia. On 21 January 2025, Firefox added Ecosia as a default search option for users in Austria, Switzerland, Belgium, Sweden, Italy, the Netherlands, and Spain.

== Reception ==
A 2021 article in Ethical Consumer examined Ecosia and its relation to its search provider, Bing. Giving Ecosia an "Ethiscore" of 11, in contrast to Google (5.5) and Microsoft Bing (6.5), Ethical Consumer found Ecosia to be superior to the other search engine companies it looked at, but marked it down in seven categories for its relationship with Microsoft (the lowest scorer in those categories). Ethical Consumer made a point of clarifying that it is not the actual searches which lead to tree planting, but the click-through of search engine users to the ads, and called for improved transparency concerning its relationship with Microsoft Bing.

A 2021 review by TechRadar praised the privacy focus and quality of search experience but cautioned users about the privacy downsides of its reliance on Bing as well as the inconvenience of Ecosia insisting on installing their extensions.

== See also ==
- Bright green environmentalism
- Comparison of search engines
- Ecotechnology
- Environmental technology
- Greenwashing
- List of search engines
- List of search engines by popularity
- Technogaianism
