= OVHcloud =

French web hosting and cloud computing company

OVH Groupe SA
- Type: Public (Société anonyme)
- Traded as: Euronext Paris: OVH; CAC Small component
- ISIN: FR0014005HJ9
- Industry: Cloud computing, hosting
- Founded: 2 November 1999; 27 years ago
- Headquarters: Roubaix, France
- Key people: Octave Klaba (Founder, chairman); Benjamin Revcolevschi (CEO); Henryk Klaba (President); Miroslaw Klaba (R&D director)
- Products: VPS; dedicated hosting service; cloud computing; public cloud; private cloud; web hosting; DSL
- Revenue: ▲€897 million (2023)
- Net income: −10,297,000 ±1000 euro (2024)
- Number of employees: 3,074 (2025)
- ASN: 16276
- Website: www.ovhcloud.com/en/

OVHcloud, legally OVH Groupe SA, is a French cloud computing company which offers VPS, dedicated servers, and other web services. The company was founded in 1999 by the Klaba family and is headquartered in Roubaix, France. In 2019 OVH adopted OVHcloud as its public brand name.

== History and growth ==
OVH was founded in November 1999 by Octave Klaba, with the help of three family members (Henry, Haline, and Miroslaw).

In August 2023, it was announced OVHcloud was in exclusive negotiations for the acquisition of the Cologne-headquartered edge computing software company, gridscale GmbH.

According to W3Techs, OVH served as the data center provider for 2.7% of all websites in 2026.

=== Funding ===
In October 2016, OVH raised $250 million in order to raise further international expansion. This funding round valued OVH at over US$1 billion. In the fiscal year of 2016, OVH reportedly had around $343 million in revenue. In 2018 OVH announced its five-year plans to triple investment starting in 2021. Which represent between 4.6 and $8.1 billion U.S. dollars (4 to 7 billion euros).

In October 2021, OVHcloud filed its IPO and is listed on the Euronext Paris, the Paris Stock Exchange as OVH. In December 2021, OVHcloud became part of the Paris SBF120 index.

=== Operations ===
As of 2021, OVH had 30 data centers in 19 countries hosting 300,000 servers. The company offers localized services such as customer service offices in many European countries, as well as in North America, Africa, and Singapore. As of 2019, OVH is considered one of the largest cloud computing providers in the world, with over a million customers and one of the largest OpenStack deployments in the world, and a network capacity totaling over 20 Tbit/s

As of 2017, OVH was known for its offering of email hosting service, considered one of the largest in the world, in addition to its general Internet hosting services.

OVH uses in-house design and manufacturing, including custom-made servers (based on standard components) and a modular shipping container architecture. In 2019, the Canadian data center (Beauharnois, Quebec) was considered a leading example of the OVH model.

In March 2025, OVHcloud US announced that it has expanded its network by introducing a Local Zone in Seattle, enhancing data processing speeds and connectivity for Pacific Northwest businesses. This addition aims to lower latency and support various cloud applications in the region.

=== Partnerships ===
As of 2016, OVH was one of the sponsors for Let's Encrypt, a free TLS encryption service, and OVH's hardware supplier is Super Micro Computer Inc.

=== Certificates ===
In March 2025, OVHcloud obtained the SecNumCloud 3.2 qualification for its highly secure cloud platform, Bare Metal Pod. Awarded by the French Cybersecurity Agency (ANSSI), this certification acknowledges the platform's adherence to stringent security standards. The qualification further supports OVHcloud's efforts in providing secure cloud solutions for public and private sector organizations, addressing strategic autonomy requirements and ensuring compliance for sensitive operations.

In 2026, OVHcloud posted a positive free cash flow of almost €25 million — a first since its stock market listing.

== Incidents ==
In March 2021, OVH suffered a large fire at its datacenter in Strasbourg, France. SBG2 had been built in 2016 with a capacity of 30,000 physical servers. SBG2 was declared a total loss, with early reports indicating damage to SBG1, and services across all four Strasbourg locations experiencing disruptions. The company's chairman, Octave Klaba, took to Twitter to confirm that all its staff were safe. All customer data and backups stored in SBG2 were lost. SBG1 was damaged partially while SBG4 remained intact, and SBG3 was intact but without power, though the servers at the latter sites were taken offline temporarily. In September 2021, the company filed a report with the Autorité des marchés financiers documenting the estimated damage at about €105 million. In 2023, OVH was ordered to pay €250,000 to two customers that had lost data, and more than 130 other customers are engaged in a class-action lawsuit against the company.

== Controversies ==
=== WikiLeaks ===
In December 2010, French Gizmodo edition revealed that WikiLeaks selected OVH as its new hosting provider, following Amazon's refusal to host it. On December 3, the growing controversy prompted Eric Besson, France's Industry Minister, to inquire about legal ways to prohibit this hosting in France. The attempt failed. On December 6, 2010, a judge ruled that there was no need for OVH to cease hosting WikiLeaks. The case was rejected on the grounds that such a case required an adversarial hearing.
