= OIP =

OIP may refer to:

- Ohio Institute of Photography, US
- Ovamboland Independence Party, later National Democratic Party, Namibia
- Oil-for-Food Programme, a former UN programme in Iraq
  - Former Office of the Iraqi Programme
- × Oncidopsis (Oip.), an orchid nothogenus corresponding to Miltoniopsis × Oncidium
