= Octave Klaba =

Octave Klaba is a French billionaire entrepreneur of Polish origin, founder of OVHcloud.

== Biography ==
Octave Klaba was born in Poland in 1975.

He founded OVH in Roubaix (northern France) in 1999.

He left his position as CEO in 2018.

In 2021, his company was listed on the stock exchange.

In 2025, Octave Klaba took back the reins of his company OVHcloud, reunifying the roles of chairman and chief executive officer.

In 2026, he announced his intention to enter the LLM market. One of his goals is to compete with Mistral.
