= Comparison of web browsers =

A web browser is an application that allows you to access and view websites and other content on the internet. Different browsers have their own strengths, focusing on speed, privacy, or customizability, and can be used on various devices, including desktops, laptops, and mobile phones.

This is a comparison of both historical and current web browsers based on developer, engine, platform(s), releases, license, and cost.

== General information ==
Basic general information about the browsers. Browsers listed on a light purple background are discontinued. Platforms with a yellow background have limited support.

Browser	Developer	Layout engine	Platform	Latest release		License	Cost (USD)
Browser	Developer	Layout engine	Platform	Version	Date	License	Cost (USD)
Amaya (discontinued)	W3C, INRIA	Custom	Linux	11.4.4	2012-01-18	W3C	No cost
Amaya (discontinued)	W3C, INRIA	Custom	macOS	11.4.4	2012-01-18	W3C	No cost
Amaya (discontinued)	W3C, INRIA	Custom	Windows	11.4.4	2012-01-18	W3C	No cost
AOL Explorer (discontinued)	America Online, Inc	Trident	Windows	1.5	2006-05	Proprietary	No cost
Arora (discontinued)	Benjamin C. Meyer	WebKit	BSD	0.11.0	2010-09-27	GPL-2.0-or-later	No cost
Arora (discontinued)	Benjamin C. Meyer	WebKit	Linux	0.11.0	2010-09-27	GPL-2.0-or-later	No cost
Arora (discontinued)	Benjamin C. Meyer	WebKit	Haiku	0.11.0	2010-09-27	GPL-2.0-or-later	No cost
Arora (discontinued)	Benjamin C. Meyer	WebKit	macOS	0.11.0	2010-09-27	GPL-2.0-or-later	No cost
Arora (discontinued)	Benjamin C. Meyer	WebKit	OS/2	0.11.0	2010-09-27	GPL-2.0-or-later	No cost
Arora (discontinued)	Benjamin C. Meyer	WebKit	Windows	0.11.0	2010-09-27	GPL-2.0-or-later	No cost
Avast Secure Browser	Avast Software	Blink	Android	8.15.0	2025-08-18	Proprietary	No cost
Avast Secure Browser	Avast Software	Blink	iOS	4.9.0	2022-10-25	Proprietary	No cost
Avast Secure Browser	Avast Software	Blink	macOS	118.0	2023-10-31	Proprietary	No cost
Avast Secure Browser	Avast Software	Blink	Windows	119.0	2023-11-13	Proprietary	No cost
Basilisk	Basilisk-Dev	Goanna	Linux	2026.06.12	2026-06-14	MPL-2.0	No cost
Basilisk	Basilisk-Dev	Goanna	macOS	2026.06.12	2026-06-14	MPL-2.0	No cost
Basilisk	Basilisk-Dev	Goanna	Windows	2026.06.12	2026-06-14	MPL-2.0	No cost
Brave	Brave Software Inc.	Blink	Android	1.100.58	2026-11-18	MPL-2.0	No cost
Brave	Brave Software Inc.	Blink	iOS	1.100.58	2026-11-18	MPL-2.0	No cost
Brave	Brave Software Inc.	Blink	Linux	1.100.58	2026-11-18	MPL-2.0	No cost
Brave	Brave Software Inc.	Blink	macOS	1.100.58	2026-11-18	MPL-2.0	No cost
Brave	Brave Software Inc.	Blink	Windows	1.100.58	2026-11-18	MPL-2.0	No cost
Camino (discontinued)	The Camino Project	Gecko	macOS	2.1.2	2012-03-14	Tri-license (Note: MPL-1.1, GPL-2.0, LGPL-2.1)	No cost
Chrome	Google	Blink	Android	158.0.8127.42	2026-11-17	Proprietary (Note: Chromium, on which Google Chrome is based, is open source; the features Google adds to Chrome (such as H.264 and ACC decoding, built-in Adobe Flash, and an auto-updater system, among other things) are closed-source. See Chromium (web browser) § Differences from Google Chrome and Google Chrome's Terms of Service for more info.)	No cost
Chrome	Google	Blink	iOS	158.0.8127.35	2026-11-12	Proprietary	No cost
Chrome	Google	Blink	Linux	158.0.8127.36	2026-11-17	Proprietary	No cost
Chrome	Google	Blink	macOS	158.0.8127.37	2026-11-17	Proprietary	No cost
Chrome	Google	Blink	Windows	158.0.8127.37	2026-11-17	Proprietary	No cost
Chromium	The Chromium Project	Blink		(built nightly)		BSD	No cost
Cliqz (discontinued)	Cliqz GmbH	Gecko	Android	1.10.1	2021-06-14	MPL-2.0	No cost
Cliqz (discontinued)	Cliqz GmbH	Gecko	iOS	3.7.2	2021-06-10	MPL-2.0	No cost
Cliqz (discontinued)	Cliqz GmbH	Gecko	macOS	1.38.0	2020-07-22	MPL-2.0	No cost
Cliqz (discontinued)	Cliqz GmbH	Gecko	Windows	1.38.0	2020-07-22	MPL-2.0	No cost
Comodo Dragon	Comodo Group	Blink	Windows	131.0.6778.109	2024-12-23	Proprietary	No cost
Comodo IceDragon (discontinued)	Comodo Group	Gecko	Windows	65.0.2.15	2019-06-19	Proprietary	No cost
Dillo	The Dillo team	Custom	BSD	3.3.0	2026-04-26	GPL-3.0-or-later	No cost
Dillo	The Dillo team	Custom	Linux	3.3.0	2026-04-26	GPL-3.0-or-later	No cost
Dillo	The Dillo team	Custom	macOS	3.3.0	2026-04-26	GPL-3.0-or-later	No cost
Dillo	The Dillo team	Custom	Unix	3.3.0	2026-04-26	GPL-3.0-or-later	No cost
Dillo	The Dillo team	Custom	Windows	3.3.0	2026-04-26	GPL-3.0-or-later	No cost
Dooble	Dooble Team	Blink	BSD	2025.04.07	2025-04-07	BSD-3-Clause	No cost
Dooble	Dooble Team	Blink	Linux	2025.04.07	2025-04-07	BSD-3-Clause	No cost
Dooble	Dooble Team	Blink	macOS	2025.04.07	2025-04-07	BSD-3-Clause	No cost
Dooble	Dooble Team	Blink	Unix	2025.04.07	2025-04-07	BSD-3-Clause	No cost
Dooble	Dooble Team	Blink	Windows	2025.04.07	2025-04-07	BSD-3-Clause	No cost
Edge	Microsoft	EdgeHTML (Note: EdgeHTML until 2020.); Blink (Note: Blink since 2020.)	Android	144.0.3719.81	2026-01-20	Proprietary (Note: Chromium, on which Microsoft Edge is based, is open source; the features Microsoft adds to Edge are closed-source. See Chromium (web browser) for more info.)	No cost
Edge	Microsoft	EdgeHTML; Blink	iOS	144.0.3719.81	2026-01-20	Proprietary	No cost
Edge	Microsoft	EdgeHTML; Blink	Linux	145.0.3800.65	2026-02-17	Proprietary	No cost
Edge	Microsoft	EdgeHTML; Blink	macOS	145.0.3800.65	2026-02-17	Proprietary	No cost
Edge	Microsoft	EdgeHTML; Blink	Windows	145.0.3800.65	2026-02-17	Proprietary	No cost
ELinks	Baudis, Fonseca, et al.	Fork of Links	BSD	0.20.0	2026-07-26	GPL-2.0-only	No cost
ELinks	Baudis, Fonseca, et al.	Fork of Links	Linux	0.20.0	2026-07-26	GPL-2.0-only	No cost
ELinks	Baudis, Fonseca, et al.	Fork of Links	macOS	0.20.0	2026-07-26	GPL-2.0-only	No cost
ELinks	Baudis, Fonseca, et al.	Fork of Links	Unix	0.20.0	2026-07-26	GPL-2.0-only	No cost
Falkon	David Rosca	Blink	BSD	26.04.3	2026-06-28	GPL-3.0-or-later	No cost
Falkon	David Rosca	Blink	Haiku	26.04.3	2026-06-28	GPL-3.0-or-later	No cost
Falkon	David Rosca	Blink	Linux	26.04.3	2026-06-28	GPL-3.0-or-later	No cost
Falkon	David Rosca	Blink	macOS	26.04.3	2026-06-28	GPL-3.0-or-later	No cost
Falkon	David Rosca	Blink	Unix	26.04.3	2026-06-28	GPL-3.0-or-later	No cost
Falkon	David Rosca	Blink	Windows	26.04.3	2026-06-28	GPL-3.0-or-later	No cost
Firefox	Mozilla Foundation	Gecko (Note: Gecko before v57.); Gecko w/Servo (Note: Gecko with Servo, v57 & after.)	Android	160.0.1	2026-11-17	MPL-2.0	No cost
Firefox	Mozilla Foundation	Gecko; Gecko w/Servo	BSD	160.0.1	2026-11-17	MPL-2.0	No cost
Firefox	Mozilla Foundation	Gecko; Gecko w/Servo	iOS	160.0.1	2026-11-17	MPL-2.0	No cost
Firefox	Mozilla Foundation	Gecko; Gecko w/Servo	Linux	160.0.1	2026-11-17	MPL-2.0	No cost
Firefox	Mozilla Foundation	Gecko; Gecko w/Servo	macOS	160.0.1	2026-11-17	MPL-2.0	No cost
Firefox	Mozilla Foundation	Gecko; Gecko w/Servo	Unix	160.0.1	2026-11-17	MPL-2.0	No cost
Firefox	Mozilla Foundation	Gecko; Gecko w/Servo	Windows	160.0.1	2026-11-17	MPL-2.0	No cost
Flock (discontinued)	Flock Inc	WebKit	BSD	3.5.3.4641	2011-02-01	Proprietary (Note: Proprietary as of 3.0.)	No cost
Flock (discontinued)	Flock Inc	WebKit	Linux	3.5.3.4641	2011-02-01	Proprietary	No cost
Flock (discontinued)	Flock Inc	WebKit	macOS	3.5.3.4641	2011-02-01	Proprietary	No cost
Flock (discontinued)	Flock Inc	WebKit	Windows	3.5.3.4641	2011-02-01	Proprietary	No cost
Galeon (discontinued)	Marco Pesenti Gritti	Gecko	BSD			GPL	No cost
Galeon (discontinued)	Marco Pesenti Gritti	Gecko	Linux			GPL	No cost
Galeon (discontinued)	Marco Pesenti Gritti	Gecko	macOS			GPL	No cost
Galeon (discontinued)	Marco Pesenti Gritti	Gecko	Unix			GPL	No cost
GNOME Web (Epiphany)	Marco Pesenti Gritti	WebKit	BSD	50.0	2026-03-12	GPL-3.0-or-later	No cost
GNOME Web (Epiphany)	Marco Pesenti Gritti	WebKit	Linux	50.0	2026-03-12	GPL-3.0-or-later	No cost
GNOME Web (Epiphany)	Marco Pesenti Gritti	WebKit	macOS	50.0	2026-03-12	GPL-3.0-or-later	No cost
GNOME Web (Epiphany)	Marco Pesenti Gritti	WebKit	Unix	50.0	2026-03-12	GPL-3.0-or-later	No cost
GNU IceCat	GNU	Gecko	Android	153.7.0	2026-11-09	MPL-2.0	No cost
GNU IceCat	GNU	Gecko	Linux	153.7.0	2026-11-09	MPL-2.0	No cost
GNU IceCat	GNU	Gecko	macOS	153.7.0	2026-11-09	MPL-2.0	No cost
GNU IceCat	GNU	Gecko	Windows	153.7.0	2026-11-09	MPL-2.0	No cost
iCab	Alexander Clauss	WebKit	macOS	6.3.6	2025-11-16	Proprietary (Note: Browser.); LGPL (Note: WebKit.)	Depends (Note: No cost, with Pro at cost ($20).)
Internet Explorer (discontinued)	Microsoft, Spyglass	Trident	Windows			Proprietary	Bundled (Note: Included with Windows.)
Internet Explorer for Mac (discontinued)	Microsoft	Tasman	macOS	5.2.3	2003-06-16	Proprietary	No cost
K-Meleon	Dorian, KKO, et al.	Goanna	Windows	76.4.7	2023-04-07	GPL	No cost
Konqueror	KDE	KHTML; WebKit	BSD	26.04.2	2026-05-29	GPL-2.0-or-later	No cost
Konqueror	KDE	KHTML; WebKit	Linux	26.04.2	2026-05-29	GPL-2.0-or-later	No cost
Konqueror	KDE	KHTML; WebKit	macOS	26.04.2	2026-05-29	GPL-2.0-or-later	No cost
Konqueror	KDE	KHTML; WebKit	Unix	26.04.2	2026-05-29	GPL-2.0-or-later	No cost
Konqueror	KDE	KHTML; WebKit	Windows	26.04.2	2026-05-29	GPL-2.0-or-later	No cost
Ladybird	Ladybird Browser Initiative	LibWeb	Android			BSD-2-Clause	No cost
Ladybird	Ladybird Browser Initiative	LibWeb	BSD			BSD-2-Clause	No cost
Ladybird	Ladybird Browser Initiative	LibWeb	Haiku			BSD-2-Clause	No cost
Ladybird	Ladybird Browser Initiative	LibWeb	Linux			BSD-2-Clause	No cost
Ladybird	Ladybird Browser Initiative	LibWeb	macOS			BSD-2-Clause	No cost
Links	Patocka, et al.	Custom	BSD	2.30	2024-07-27	GPL-2.0-or-later	No cost
Links	Patocka, et al.	Custom	Haiku	2.30	2024-07-27	GPL-2.0-or-later	No cost
Links	Patocka, et al.	Custom	Linux	2.30	2024-07-27	GPL-2.0-or-later	No cost
Links	Patocka, et al.	Custom	macOS	2.30	2024-07-27	GPL-2.0-or-later	No cost
Links	Patocka, et al.	Custom	Unix	2.30	2024-07-27	GPL-2.0-or-later	No cost
Links	Patocka, et al.	Custom	Windows	2.30	2024-07-27	GPL-2.0-or-later	No cost
Lunascape	Lunascape Corporation	Gecko; Trident; WebKit	Android			Proprietary	No cost
Lunascape	Lunascape Corporation	Gecko; Trident; WebKit	iOS	v14.2.6	2025-06-23	Proprietary	No cost
Lunascape	Lunascape Corporation	Gecko; Trident; WebKit	macOS			Proprietary	No cost
Lunascape	Lunascape Corporation	Gecko; Trident; WebKit	Windows	6.15.2	2018-02-22	Proprietary	No cost
Lynx	Montulli, Grobe, Rezac, et al.	Fork of libwww	BSD	2.9.3	2026-05-27	GPL-2.0-only	No cost
Lynx	Montulli, Grobe, Rezac, et al.	Fork of libwww	Haiku	2.9.3	2026-05-27	GPL-2.0-only	No cost
Lynx	Montulli, Grobe, Rezac, et al.	Fork of libwww	Linux	2.9.3	2026-05-27	GPL-2.0-only	No cost
Lynx	Montulli, Grobe, Rezac, et al.	Fork of libwww	macOS	2.9.3	2026-05-27	GPL-2.0-only	No cost
Lynx	Montulli, Grobe, Rezac, et al.	Fork of libwww	Unix	2.9.3	2026-05-27	GPL-2.0-only	No cost
Lynx	Montulli, Grobe, Rezac, et al.	Fork of libwww	Windows	2.9.3	2026-05-27	GPL-2.0-only	No cost
Maxthon	Maxthon International Limited	Blink; Trident	Android	7.0.2.2600	2023-06-29	Proprietary	No cost
Maxthon	Maxthon International Limited	Blink; Trident	iOS	7.1.9	2023-08-22	Proprietary	No cost
Maxthon	Maxthon International Limited	Blink; Trident	Linux	1.0.5.3	2014-09-09	Proprietary	No cost
Maxthon	Maxthon International Limited	Blink; Trident	macOS	5.1.70	2022-09-29	Proprietary	No cost
Maxthon	Maxthon International Limited	Blink; Trident	Windows	7.1.7.8100	2023-12-11	Proprietary	No cost
Midori	Christian Dywan, et al.	WebKit; Gecko	Android	3.5.15	2025-07-14	LGPL-2.1-or-later	No cost
Midori	Christian Dywan, et al.	WebKit; Gecko	Linux			LGPL-2.1-or-later	No cost
Midori	Christian Dywan, et al.	WebKit; Gecko	macOS			LGPL-2.1-or-later	No cost
Midori	Christian Dywan, et al.	WebKit; Gecko	Windows			LGPL-2.1-or-later	No cost
Mosaic (discontinued)	Marc Andreessen and Eric Bina, NCSA	Custom		3.0	1997-01-07	Proprietary	Depends (Note: No cost for non-commercial use.)
Mozilla Application Suite (discontinued)	Mozilla Foundation	Gecko		1.7.13	2006-04-21	Tri-license	No cost
Netscape (v.6–7) (Note: There are five different products which all carry the name Netscape: Netscape versions 1 to 4, properly called Netscape Navigator, was a browser based on the original Netscape engine. Netscape 4 also was available as an Internet suite, properly called Netscape Communicator. Netscape 6 and 7 was a new Internet suite based on the Gecko engine and the Mozilla Application Suite user interface. Netscape 8, properly called Netscape Browser, was a distinct browser based on Firefox that could use either the Gecko (Firefox) or Trident (Internet Explorer) engine. Netscape resumed use of the Navigator name from Netscape Navigator 9.0 beta 1. See Netscape for more info.) (discontinued)	Netscape Communications Corporation, AOL	Gecko		7.2	2004-08-17	Proprietary; Tri-license (Note: Gecko.)	No cost
Netscape Browser (v.8) (discontinued)	Mercurial Communications for AOL	Gecko; Trident		8.1.3	2007-04-02	Proprietary (Note: Browser & Trident.); Tri-license	No cost
Netscape Communicator (v.4) (discontinued)	Netscape Communications	Fork of Mosaic		4.8	2002-08-22	Proprietary	No cost
Netscape Navigator (v.1–4) (discontinued)	Netscape Communications	Fork of Mosaic		4.0.8	1998-11-09	Proprietary	No cost
Netscape Navigator 9 (discontinued)	Netscape Communications (division of AOL)	Gecko		9.0.0.6	2008-02-20	Proprietary; Tri-license	No cost
NetSurf	The NetSurf Developers	Custom	BSD	3.11	2023-12-28	GPL-2.0-only	No cost
NetSurf	The NetSurf Developers	Custom	Haiku	3.11	2023-12-28	GPL-2.0-only	No cost
NetSurf	The NetSurf Developers	Custom	Linux	3.11	2023-12-28	GPL-2.0-only	No cost
NetSurf	The NetSurf Developers	Custom	macOS	3.11	2023-12-28	GPL-2.0-only	No cost
NetSurf	The NetSurf Developers	Custom	RISC OS	3.11	2023-12-28	GPL-2.0-only	No cost
NetSurf	The NetSurf Developers	Custom	Unix	3.11	2023-12-28	GPL-2.0-only	No cost
NetSurf	The NetSurf Developers	Custom	Windows	3.11	2023-12-28	GPL-2.0-only	No cost
OmniWeb (discontinued)	The Omni Group	WebKit	macOS	5.11.2	2012-07-20	Proprietary; LGPL	No cost
Opera	Opera Software	Presto (Note: Presto from 2003 until 2013.); Blink (Note: Blink since 2013, Opera 15.)		140.0.6074.36	2026-11-18	Proprietary	No cost
Opera Mobile	Opera Software	Presto (Note: Presto until 12.16.); WebKit for 14; Blink (Note: Blink from 15.0.)	Android	63.3.3216.58675	2021-04-23	Proprietary	No cost
Opera Mobile	Opera Software	Presto; WebKit for 14; Blink	iOS	3.1.0	2021-06-10	Proprietary	No cost
Opera Mobile	Opera Software	Presto; WebKit for 14; Blink	Symbian	12.0.22	2012-06-24	Proprietary	No cost
Opera Mobile	Opera Software	Presto; WebKit for 14; Blink	Windows Mobile	10.0	2010-03-16	Proprietary	No cost
Origyn Web Browser	Sand-labs	WebKit	AROS	1.25	2016-04-02	BSD-3-Clause	No cost
Origyn Web Browser	Sand-labs	WebKit	AmigaOS 4.x	1.23r5	2022-01-02	BSD-3-Clause	No cost
Origyn Web Browser	Sand-labs	WebKit	MorphOS	1.24	2014-04-15	BSD-3-Clause	No cost
Pale Moon	Moonchild Productions	Goanna	Linux	35.0.3	2026-10-27	MPL-2.0	No cost
Pale Moon	Moonchild Productions	Goanna	Windows	35.0.3	2026-10-27	MPL-2.0	No cost
Puffin Browser	CloudMosa Inc.	WebKit	iOS	10.4.1.51678	2024-10-02	Proprietary	Depends (Note: Subscriptions available for $1/month, $0.25/week, or $0.05/day.)
Puffin Browser	CloudMosa Inc.	WebKit	Android	10.4.1.51678	2024-10-02	Proprietary	Depends
Puffin Browser	CloudMosa Inc.	WebKit	Linux	10.4.1.51678	2024-10-02	Proprietary	Depends
Puffin Browser	CloudMosa Inc.	WebKit	macOS	10.4.1.51678	2024-10-02	Proprietary	Depends
Puffin Browser	CloudMosa Inc.	WebKit	Windows	10.4.1.51678	2024-10-02	Proprietary	Depends
qutebrowser	Freya Bruhin	WebKit; QtWebEngine	BSD	3.7.0	2026-04-03	GPL-3.0-or-later	No cost
qutebrowser	Freya Bruhin	WebKit; QtWebEngine	Linux	3.7.0	2026-04-03	GPL-3.0-or-later	No cost
qutebrowser	Freya Bruhin	WebKit; QtWebEngine	macOS	3.7.0	2026-04-03	GPL-3.0-or-later	No cost
qutebrowser	Freya Bruhin	WebKit; QtWebEngine	Windows	3.7.0	2026-04-03	GPL-3.0-or-later	No cost
Safari	Apple Inc.	WebKit	iOS			Proprietary; LGPL	Bundled (Note: Included with macOS, iOS and iPadOS.)
Safari	Apple Inc.	WebKit	macOS			Proprietary; LGPL	Bundled
SalamWeb	Salam WebTechnologies DMCC	Blink	Android	4.6.0.48	2020-09-29	Proprietary	No cost
SalamWeb	Salam WebTechnologies DMCC	Blink	iOS	4.6.3	2020-09-29	Proprietary	No cost
SalamWeb	Salam WebTechnologies DMCC	Blink	macOS	4.6.3.589	2020-09-24	Proprietary	No cost
SalamWeb	Salam WebTechnologies DMCC	Blink	Windows	4.5	2020-07-31	Proprietary	No cost
SeaMonkey	SeaMonkey Council	Gecko	BSD	2.53.24	2026-07-28	MPL-2.0	No cost
SeaMonkey	SeaMonkey Council	Gecko	Linux	2.53.24	2026-07-28	MPL-2.0	No cost
SeaMonkey	SeaMonkey Council	Gecko	macOS	2.53.24	2026-07-28	MPL-2.0	No cost
SeaMonkey	SeaMonkey Council	Gecko	Unix	2.53.24	2026-07-28	MPL-2.0	No cost
SeaMonkey	SeaMonkey Council	Gecko	Windows	2.53.24	2026-07-28	MPL-2.0	No cost
Shiira (discontinued)	Happy Macintosh Developing Team	WebKit	macOS	2.3	2009-08-11	BSD-3-Clause	No cost
Sleipnir	Fenrir Inc.	Blink; Trident	Android	3.7.7	2024-10-29	Proprietary	No cost
Sleipnir	Fenrir Inc.	Blink; Trident	iOS	4.15	2024-12-24	Proprietary	No cost
Sleipnir	Fenrir Inc.	Blink; Trident	macOS	4.7.9	2021-03-02	Proprietary	No cost
Sleipnir	Fenrir Inc.	Blink; Trident	Windows	6.5.9	2024-12-09	Proprietary	No cost
SRWare Iron	SRWare	Blink	Android	120.0.6100.0	2024-01-27	Proprietary	No cost
SRWare Iron	SRWare	Blink	Linux	131.0.6650.1	2025-01-03	Proprietary	No cost
SRWare Iron	SRWare	Blink	macOS	131.0.6650.1	2025-01-04	Proprietary	No cost
SRWare Iron	SRWare	Blink	Windows	131.0.6650.1	2022-04-29	Proprietary	No cost
surf	suckless.org	WebKit	BSD	2.1	2021-05-08	MIT	No cost
surf	suckless.org	WebKit	Linux	2.1	2021-05-08	MIT	No cost
surf	suckless.org	WebKit	Unix	2.1	2021-05-08	MIT	No cost
surf	suckless.org	WebKit	Windows	2.1	2021-05-08	MIT	No cost
Torch Browser (discontinued)	Torch Media	Blink	macOS	69.2.0.1713	2020-09-30	Proprietary	No cost
Torch Browser (discontinued)	Torch Media	Blink	Windows	69.2.0.1713	2020-09-30	Proprietary	No cost
Uzbl (discontinued)	Dieter Plaetinck	WebKit	Unix-like	0.9.1	2016-10-27	GPL-3.0-only	No cost
Vivaldi	Vivaldi Technologies	Blink	Android	8.3 (4192.82)	2026-11-13	Proprietary	No cost
Vivaldi	Vivaldi Technologies	Blink	Linux	8.3 (4191.44)	2026-11-13	Proprietary	No cost
Vivaldi	Vivaldi Technologies	Blink	macOS	8.3 (4191.44)	2026-11-13	Proprietary	No cost
Vivaldi	Vivaldi Technologies	Blink	Windows	8.3 (4191.44)	2026-11-13	Proprietary	No cost
Waterfox	Alex Kontos	Gecko	Android	6.7.8	2026-11-07	MPL-2.0	No cost
Waterfox	Alex Kontos	Gecko	Linux	6.7.8	2026-11-07	MPL-2.0	No cost
Waterfox	Alex Kontos	Gecko	macOS	6.7.8	2026-11-07	MPL-2.0	No cost
Waterfox	Alex Kontos	Gecko	Windows	6.7.8	2026-11-07	MPL-2.0	No cost
WebPositive	Haiku	WebKit	Haiku	1.9.11	2024-02-05	MIT	No cost
WorldWideWeb (Nexus) (discontinued)	Tim Berners-Lee	Custom	NeXTSTEP	0.17	1994	Public domain	No cost
w3m	Akinori Ito	Custom	BSD	0.5.6	2026-01-23	MIT	No cost
w3m	Akinori Ito	Custom	Linux	0.5.6	2026-01-23	MIT	No cost
w3m	Akinori Ito	Custom	macOS	0.5.6	2026-01-23	MIT	No cost
w3m	Akinori Ito	Custom	Unix	0.5.6	2026-01-23	MIT	No cost
w3m	Akinori Ito	Custom	Windows	0.5.6	2026-01-23	MIT	No cost
Yandex Browser	Yandex	Blink	Android			Proprietary	No cost
Yandex Browser	Yandex	Blink	Linux			Proprietary	No cost
Yandex Browser	Yandex	Blink	iOS	23.9.1.439	2023-09-08	Proprietary	No cost
Yandex Browser	Yandex	Blink	macOS			Proprietary	No cost
Yandex Browser	Yandex	Blink	Windows			Proprietary	No cost
Browser	Developer	Layout engine	Platform	Latest release		License	Cost (USD)
Browser	Developer	Layout engine	Platform	Version	Date	License	Cost (USD)

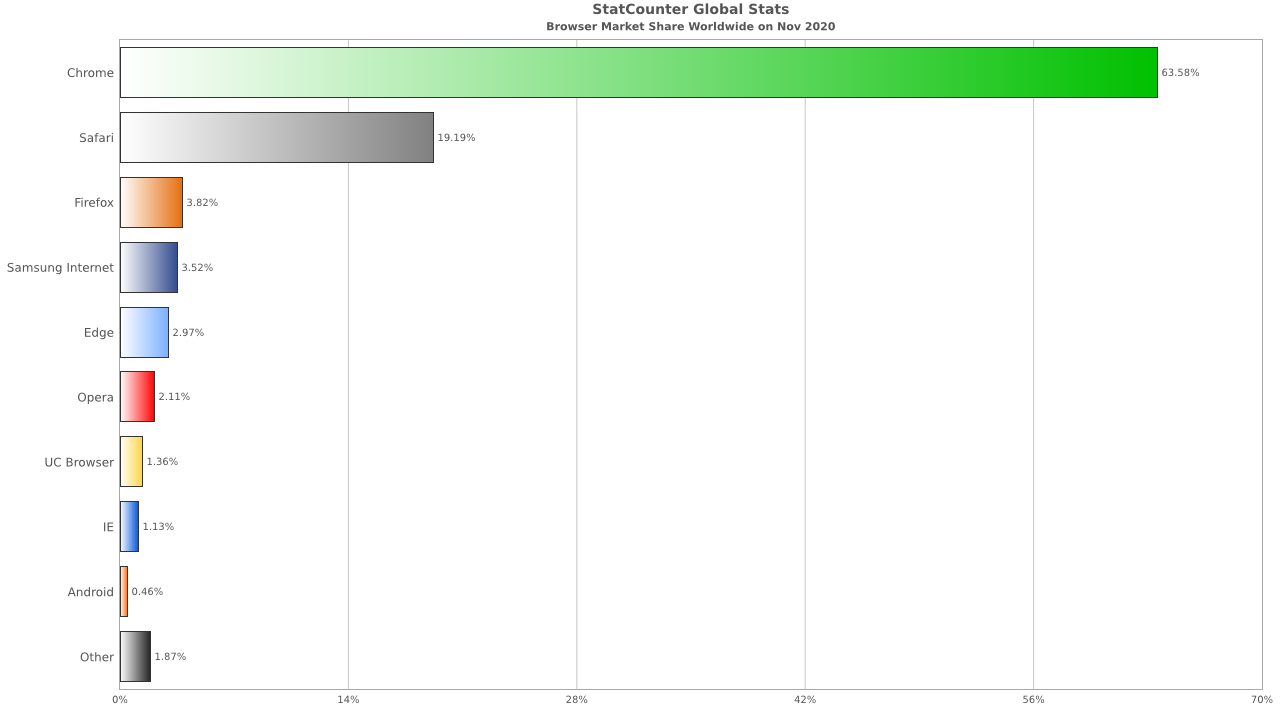
Usage share of web browsers in November 2020

== Operating system support ==
Browsers are compiled to run on certain operating systems, without emulation.

This list is not exhaustive, but rather reflects the most common OSes today (e.g. Netscape Navigator was also developed for OS/2 at a time when macOS 10 did not exist) but does not include the growing appliance segment (for example, the Opera web browser has gained a leading role for use in mobile phones, smartphones, the Nintendo DS and Wii, and Personal Digital Assistants, and is also used in some smart TVs). Both the web browser and OS means most recent version, example: Windows 11 with Internet Explorer 11.

Browser	Windows	macOS	Linux	BSD	Other Unix	Android	iOS
Amaya	Yes	Yes	Yes	Yes	Yes	Yes	No
AOL Explorer	Yes	No	No	No	No	No	No
Arora	Yes	Yes	Yes	Yes	Yes	No	No
Avast Secure Browser	Yes	Yes	Yes	No	No	Yes	Yes
Basilisk	Yes	Yes	Yes	No	No	No	No
Brave	Yes	Yes	Yes	No	No	Yes	Yes
Camino	No	Yes	No	No	No	No	No
Cliqz	Yes	Yes	Yes	No	Yes	Yes	No
Chrome	Yes	Yes (Note: Google Chrome is not available for PowerPC.)	Yes	No	No	Yes	Yes
Chromium	Yes	Yes	Yes	Yes	No	Yes	No
Dillo	Partial	Yes	Yes (Note: Dillo is included in some Linux distributions, i.e. Damn Small Linux and Feather Linux.)	Yes	Yes	No	No
Dooble	Yes	Yes	Yes	Yes	Yes	No	No
Edge	Included (Note: Microsoft Edge is included in Windows 10 and 11 and also supported on Windows 7 and later.)	Yes	Yes	No	No	Yes	Yes
ELinks	No	Yes	Yes	Yes	Yes	No	No
Falkon	Yes	Yes	Yes	Yes	Yes	No	No
Firefox	Yes	Yes	Yes (Note: Most Linux distributions which include a graphical user interface include a version of Firefox or a rebranded version of Firefox such as GNU IceCat.)	Yes	Yes	Yes	Yes
Firefox ESR	Yes	Yes	Yes	No	No	No	No
Flock	Yes	Yes	Yes	Yes	No	No	No
Galeon	No	Yes	Yes	Yes	Yes	No	No
GNOME Web	No	Yes	Yes	Yes	Yes	No	No
GNU IceCat	Yes	Partial (Note: Binaries are not released.)	Yes	No	No	Yes	No
iCab	No	Yes	No	No	No	No	Yes
Internet Explorer	Included	Dropped (Note: Dropped 5.2.)	No	No	Dropped (Note: Dropped 5.0. Internet Explorer for UNIX was available for Solaris and HP-UX.)	No	No
K-Meleon	Yes	No	No	No	No	No	No
Konqueror	Partial	Yes	Yes	Yes	Yes	No	No
Ladybird	No	Yes	Yes	Yes	Yes	Partial	No
Links	Partial	Yes	Yes	Yes	Yes	No	No
Lunascape	Yes	No	No	No	No	Yes	Yes
Lynx	Yes	Yes	Yes	Yes	Yes	No	No
Maxthon	Yes	Yes	Yes	No	No	Yes	Yes
Midori	Yes	Yes	Yes	Yes	Yes	Yes	Yes
NetSurf	Yes	Yes	Yes	Yes	Yes	No	No
OmniWeb	No	Yes	No	No	No	No	No
Opera	Yes	Yes	Yes	Yes	Yes	Yes	Yes (Note: Opera Mini and Coast are available for iOS.)
Pale Moon	Yes	Yes	Yes	Yes	No	Dropped	No
qutebrowser	Yes	Yes	Yes	Yes	No	No	No
Safari	Dropped (Note: Dropped 5.1.7.)	Included	No	No	No	No	Included
SalamWeb	Yes	Yes	No	No	Yes	Yes	No
SeaMonkey	Yes	Yes	Yes	Yes	Yes	No	No
Shiira	No	Yes	No	No	No	No	No
Sleipnir	Yes	Yes	No	No	No	Yes	Yes
SRWare Iron	Yes	Yes	Yes	Yes	Yes	Yes	No
surf	Partial	No	Yes	Yes	Yes	No	No
Torch Browser	Yes	Yes	No	No	No	No	No
Vivaldi	Yes	Yes	Yes	No	No	Yes	No
WorldWideWeb	No	No	No	No	No	No	No
w3m	Yes	Yes	Yes	Yes	Yes	No	No
Browser	Windows	macOS	Linux	BSD	Other Unix	Android	iOS

== Browser features ==
Information about what common browser features are implemented natively (without third-party add-ons).

Browser	Bookmark management	Download management	Password managing	History	Open tabs from previous sessions	Form managing	Spell checking	Search engine toolbar	Per-site security configuration	Privacy mode	Auto-updater
Amaya	No	No	Yes			No	Yes	No	?	No	No
AOL Explorer	Yes	No	No			Yes	No	Yes	?	No	?
Arora	Yes	Yes	Yes			Yes	No	Yes	?	Yes	No
Avast Secure Browser	Yes	Yes	Yes	Yes	Yes	Yes	Yes	Yes	Partial (Note: Not available on mobile.)	Yes	Yes
Basilisk	Yes	Yes	Yes			Yes	Yes	Yes	Yes	Yes	Yes
Brave	Yes	Yes	Yes	Yes	Yes	Yes	Yes	Yes	Yes	Yes	Yes
Camino	Yes	Yes	Yes			Yes	Yes	Yes	?	No	Yes
Cliqz	Yes	Yes	Yes			Yes	Yes	Yes	Yes	Yes	Yes
Chrome	Yes	Yes	Yes	Yes	Yes	Yes	Yes	Yes	Partial	Yes (Note: Starting with version 4, Google Chrome can disable Cookies, Images, JavaScript, Plugins, Popups, and Geolocation individually.)	Yes
Chromium	Yes	Yes	Yes	Yes	Yes	Yes	Yes	Partial (Note: Lacks search toolbar, but search URL autocompletion provided via addressbar.)	Partial	Yes	No
Dillo	Partial	No	No			No	No	Partial	?	No	No
Dooble	Yes	Yes	Yes			No	No	Yes	?	Yes	?
Edge	Yes	Yes	Yes	Yes	Yes	Yes	Yes	Partial	No	Yes	Yes (Note: There is no online update facility built into IE, but it gets updated by Windows Update when enabled. As of Version 10 automatic silent update is the default setting in Internet Explorer. In Microsoft Edge, the option to disable automatic updates via the about dialog is not included.)
ELinks	Yes	Yes	Yes			Yes	No	No	No	No	No
Falkon	Yes	Yes	Yes			Yes (Note: Available as a PIM plugin which is disabled by default, but it is part of default installation.)	Yes	Yes	No	Yes	(Note: Notification only.)
Firefox	Yes	Yes	Yes	Yes	Yes	Yes	Yes	Yes	Yes	Yes (Note: Firefox 3.5 adds the Privacy mode. Older versions of Firefox can use the Stealther extension.)	Yes
Flock	Yes	Yes	Yes			Yes	Yes	Yes	Partial (Note: Mozilla based browsers like Firefox, SeaMonkey and Flock can handle per-site settings for cookies, pop-ups, add-on installs and images. For more settings, an add-on is needed ~ for example, NoScript.)	No	Yes
Galeon	Yes	Yes	Yes			No	No	Yes	?	No	No
GNOME Web	Yes	Yes	Yes	Yes	Yes	Yes	Yes	Partial	No	Yes	No
iCab	Yes	Yes	Yes			Yes	No	Yes	?	No	?
Internet Explorer	Yes	Yes	Yes	Yes		Yes	Yes (Note: Internet Explorer 10 supports spell checking.)	Yes	Yes	Yes (Note: Internet Explorer 8 supports InPrivate Browsing.)	Yes
Internet Explorer for Mac	Yes	Yes	Yes			Yes	Yes	Yes	?	No	?
K-Meleon	Yes	No	Yes	Yes	Yes	Yes	Yes	Yes	Yes (Note: Through the Privacy toolbar, K-Meleon Versions 1.5 and 1.6, can individually disable Cookies, Images, JavaScript, Popups, and Plugins (e.g. Flash and Java).)	Yes	?
Konqueror	Yes	Yes (Note: For the download manager kdenetwork needs to be installed.)	Yes			Yes	Yes	Yes	Yes (Note: Konqueror can handle per-site settings for cookies, pop-ups, JavaScript, Java and NPAPI modules (e.g. Flash).)	No	No
Ladybird	Yes	Yes	No	Yes	Yes	No	No	Yes	?	No	No
Links	Yes	Yes	No			No	No	No	?	No	No
Lunascape	Yes	Yes	Yes			Yes	Partial (Note: Depending on user's choice of rendering engine.)	Yes	Partial	Partial	Yes
Lynx	Yes	Yes	No			No	No (Note: Lynx is able to edit text with an external editor, which can provide spell checking.)	No	Yes	No	No
Maxthon	Yes	Yes	Yes			Yes	Yes	Yes	Yes	Yes	Yes
Midori	Yes	Yes	Yes	Yes	Yes	Yes	Yes	Yes	No	Yes	No
Mosaic	Yes	No	No			No	No	No	?	No	No
Mozilla	Yes	Yes	Yes			Yes	Yes	Yes	Yes	No	Yes
Netscape	Yes	Yes	Yes			Yes	Yes	Yes	?	No	No
Netscape Browser	Yes	Yes	Yes			Yes	?	Yes	?	No	Yes
Netscape Navigator	Yes	No	No			No	No	No	?	No	No
Netscape Navigator 9	Yes	Yes	Yes			Yes	Yes	Yes	?	No	Yes
NetSurf	Yes	Yes	No			No	No	Yes	No	No	No
OmniWeb	Yes	Yes	Yes			Yes	Yes	Yes	Partial (Note: OmniWeb supports per-domain settings of options including support for disabling scripting, ad blocking, java and cookies. These settings only work on top level domains.)	No	Yes
Opera	Yes (Note: Opera versions before 15 had bookmarks. Newer Opera versions use a different concept called "Stash" instead.)	Yes	Yes	Yes	Yes	Yes (Note: Opera can auto-complete forms with your personal information and website usernames. Also there is extension AutoComplete Archived 25 July 2014 at the Wayback Machine which can complete forms with form history.)	Yes	Yes	Yes	Yes	Yes
Pale Moon	Yes	Yes	Yes	Yes	Yes	Yes	Yes	Yes	Yes	Yes	Yes
Safari	Yes	Yes	Yes	Yes	Yes	Yes	Yes	Yes	Yes	Yes	Yes
SalamWeb	Yes	Yes	Yes			Yes	Yes			Yes	Yes
SeaMonkey	Yes	Yes	Yes			Yes	Yes	Yes	Partial	Yes	Yes
Shiira	Yes	Yes	Yes			Yes	Yes	Yes	?	Yes	?
Sleipnir	Yes	Yes	Yes			Yes	Yes	Yes	Yes	No	
SRWare Iron	Yes	Yes	Yes		Yes	Yes	Yes	Yes	Yes	Yes	No
surf	No (Note: Developers distribute patch enabling this functionality.)	No (Note: This functionality is handled via third-party software by browser's design.)	No			No	No	No	Yes/No (Note: This browser allows choosing a custom cookie jar, making cookies from other sessions unavailable to new session.)	Yes/No	No
Torch Browser	Yes	Yes	Yes			Yes	Yes	Yes	Yes	Yes	Yes
Vivaldi	Yes	Yes	Yes	Yes	Yes	Yes	Yes	Yes	Yes	Yes	Yes
WorldWideWeb	Yes	No	No			No	Yes	No	?	No	No
w3m	Yes	No	No	Yes		No	No	No	?	No	No
Browser	Bookmark management	Download management	Password managing (Note: In many integrated password saving tools there are often leaks that make them unsafe.)	History	Open tabs from previous sessions	Form managing	Spell checking	Search engine toolbar	Per-site security configuration	Privacy mode	Auto-updater

== Accessibility features ==
Information about what common accessibility features are implemented natively (without third-party add-ons). Browsers that do not support pop-ups have no need for pop-up blocking abilities, so that field is marked as N/A.

Browser	Tabbed browsing	Pop-up blocking (Note: A more complete list of Pop-Up blockers and addons / programs are in the following article List of pop-up blocking software.)	Auto-play blocking	Incremental search	Ad filtering	Page zooming (Note: Page zooming is different from text resizing, as it resizes not only characters, but also multimedia objects and web page layout.)	Full text search of history	Content-modal dialogs	Canvas fingerprinting protection
Amaya	Yes	N/A	No	No	No	Yes	No	?	
AOL Explorer	Yes	Yes	No	No	No	Yes	No	?	
Arora	Yes	Yes	No	Yes	Yes	Yes	No	No	
Avast Secure Browser	Yes	Yes	66+	Yes	Yes	Yes	No	Yes	Only on mobiles
Basilisk	Yes	Yes	No	Yes	Yes	Yes	Yes	Yes	
Brave	Yes	Yes	Yes	No	Yes	Yes	No	?	
Camino	Yes	Yes	No	Yes	Yes	Yes	No	?	
Cliqz	Yes	Yes	No	Yes	Yes	Yes	Yes	?	
Chrome	Yes	Partial (Note: The option "Do not allow any site to show pop-ups" in Google Chrome, which is the default, actually allows sites to show pop-ups which are not considered harmful.)	66+	Yes	Extension support limited on newer versions	Yes	No (Note: Feature was intentionally removed via regular patch update, due to poor impact on performance.)	Yes	
Chromium	Yes	Yes	66+	Yes	No	Yes	?	Yes	
Dillo	Yes	N/A	No	No	No	No	No	No	
Dooble	Yes	Yes	No	Yes	Yes	Yes	Yes	?	
Edge	Yes	Yes	No	Yes	Removal in-progress	Yes	No	No	
ELinks	Yes	N/A	No	Yes	N/A	N/A	No	No (Note: Although text browsers don't have dialog windows, their prompts behave as modal dialogs – block the input until answer is received.)	
Falkon	Yes	Yes	No	Yes	Yes	Yes	Yes	Optional (Note: Requires building with "NONBLOCK_JS_DIALOGS" compile flag enabled; may cause crashes:.)	
Firefox	Yes	Yes	Yes	Yes	Yes	Yes	No	Yes	Yes (warning)
Flock	Yes	Yes	No	Yes	Yes	No	No	?	
Galeon	Yes	Yes	No	Yes	Yes	Yes	No	No	
GNOME Web	Yes	Yes	No	Yes	Yes (Note: Epiphany supports AdBlock as an official extension, in the epiphany-extensions package.)	Yes	Yes	Partial	
iCab	Yes	Yes	No	No	Yes	Yes	No	?	
Internet Explorer	Yes (Note: IE6 had no tabbed browsing support.)	Yes (Note: IE6 included pop-up blocking with Windows XP Service Pack 2)	No	Yes	Yes	Yes	Yes (Note: Full-text history search is available through a Windows Search iFilter)	No	
Internet Explorer for Mac	No	No	No	No	No	No	No	N/A	
K-Meleon	Yes	Yes	No	Yes	No (Note: Most Gecko browsers have options to block chosen images and cookies. Extended Ad filter support can be added by installing an extension such as Adblock Plus.)	Partial	No	?	
Konqueror	Yes	Yes	No	Yes	Yes	Yes	No	No	
Ladybird	Yes	?	Yes	Yes	?	No	No	No	
Links	Yes	Yes	No	Yes	Yes	?	No	No	
Lunascape	Yes	Yes	No	Yes	Yes	Yes	Partial	?	
Lynx	No	N/A	No	No	N/A	N/A	No	No	
Maxthon	Yes	Yes	No	Yes	Yes	Yes	No	?	
Midori	Yes	No	No	Yes	Yes	Yes	No	?	
Mosaic	No	N/A	No	No	No	No	No	?	
Mozilla	Yes	Yes	No	Yes	Yes	Yes	No	No	
Netscape	Yes	Yes	No	Yes	No	No	No	No	
Netscape Browser	Yes	Yes	No	Yes	No	No	No	No	
Netscape Navigator	No	No	No	No	No	No	No	No	
Netscape Navigator 9	Yes	Yes	No	Yes	No	No	No	No	
NetSurf	Yes	Yes	No	Yes	Yes	Yes	No	?	
OmniWeb	Yes	Yes	No	No	Yes	Yes	No	?	
Opera	Yes	Yes	No	Yes	Yes (Note: Opera 9 introduced a content blocker for webpages (Archived 9 February 2006 at the Wayback Machine). Earlier releases support wildcard protocol/domain/path and filetype blocking using a filter.ini file. ("Opera browser: Blocking unwanted ads and other cr*p using URL filtering".) More advanced Ad filtering for Opera can also be done with external software.)	Yes	Yes	Yes	
Pale Moon	Yes	Yes	No	Yes	Yes	Yes	Yes	Yes	
Safari	Yes	Yes (Note: Does not allow selective blocking of pop-ups. Safari can only block all pop-ups, or none.)	Yes	Yes	No (Note: Ad filter support can be added by installing extensions.Archived 1 July 2008 at the Wayback Machine)	Yes (Note: Page zooming supported in the iPhone version of Safari. Screen zooming is built into macOS.)	Yes (Note: Only Mac.) (Note: Full-text history search is available through Spotlight, a feature of the macOS operating system.)	Yes	
SeaMonkey	Yes	Yes	No	Yes	Yes	Yes	No	No	
Shiira	Yes	Yes	No	No	No	Yes	No	?	
Sleipnir	Yes	Yes	No	Yes	Yes	Yes	No	?	
SRWare Iron	Yes	Yes	No	No	No	Yes	Yes	?	
surf	No (Note: This functionality is handled by third-party software by browser's design.)	No	No	Yes	No	Yes	No	No	
Torch Browser	Yes	?	No	Yes	No	Yes	?	?	
WorldWideWeb	No	N/A	No	No	No	No	No	N/A	
w3m	Yes	N/A	No	Yes	No	No	No	N/A	
Browser	Tabbed browsing	Pop-up blocking	Auto-play blocking	Incremental search	Ad filtering	Page zooming	Full text search of history	Content-modal dialogs	Canvas fingerprinting protection

== Accessibility features (continued) ==
Information about what common accessibility features are implemented natively (without third-party add-ons).

Browser	Access keys	Tabbing navigation	Spatial navigation	Caret navigation	Smart bookmarks	Mouse gesture	Text-to-speech	Voice control	Can disable font smoothing (Note: Font smoothing or font rasterization is arguably an accessibility feature affecting how the fonts are rendered and font readability. Also referred as ClearType or TrueType)
Amaya	Yes	Yes	?	Yes		No	No	No	
AOL Explorer	Yes	Yes	No	No		No	No	No	
Arora	Yes	Yes	Yes	Yes		No	No	No	
Avast Secure Browser	Yes	Yes	Yes	Yes	Yes	No	No	No	No
Basilisk	Yes	Yes	No	Yes	Yes	No	No	Yes	
Camino	Yes	Yes	No	Yes		No (Note: On Mac systems, gestures are available systemwide via multitouch sensing on trackpads and mice.)	No (Note: On macOS, text-to speech and speech recognition are available systemwide and is available from menu in native Cocoa browsers.)	No	
Chrome	Yes	Yes	Yes	Yes	Yes	No (Note: Google Chrome can be given these features using extensions like smooth gestures, speechify and voice control for google chrome.)	No	No	Dropped
Chromium	Yes	Yes	Yes	Yes		No	No	No	Dropped
Dillo	Yes	No	No	No		No	No	No	
Dooble	Yes	Yes	Yes	Yes		No	No	No	
Edge	Yes	Yes	Yes	?	?	?	Yes (Note: TTS in Internet Explorer and Microsoft Edge is available through the operating system Speech API. For TTS, SAPI takes text as input and uses the TTS engine to output that text as spoken audio. This is the same technology used by the Windows accessibility tool, Narrator. SAPI and an English TTS engine have been embedded in all Windows operating systems since the release of Windows XP.)	Yes (Note: Internet Explorer and Microsoft Edge can be controlled by applications which use the operating system Speech API. A built-in application called Windows Speech Recognition ships with Windows Vista and later client versions.)	?
ELinks	Yes	Yes	Yes (Note: ELinks 0.12 supports spatial navigation.)	Yes	Yes	No	No	No	
Falkon	Yes	Yes	Yes (Note: Available as of this commit.)	Yes	Yes (Note: Supports as of v1.7.0: https://github.com/QupZilla/qupzilla/issues/458)	Yes (Note: Available as a Mouse Gestures plugin which is disabled by default, but it is part of default installation.)	No	No	
Firefox	Yes	Yes	No (Note: Doug Turner, the Minimo lead developer, has introduced spatial navigation to some special Firefox builds "Adot's notblog* "firefox, cats, mars, and more": Spatial navigation rocks". Archived from the original on 22 April 2005.. It may build as a default part of Firefox "Spatial Navigation in Mozilla". Archived from the original on 22 April 2005..)	Yes	Yes	No (Note: Mouse gesture support can be added by installing extensions like All-in-One Gestures (Firefox-only) and Mouse Gestures .)	No (Note: Firefox works with a number of screen readers such as JAWS and Microsoft Speech API through extensions.)	Yes	Yes
Flock	Yes	Yes	No	Yes		No	No	No	
Galeon	?	Yes	?	Disabled		Yes	No	No	
GNOME Web	Yes	Yes	No	Yes	Yes	Yes	No	No	
iCab	Yes	No	No	No		No	No	No	
Internet Explorer	Yes	Yes	Yes	Yes (Note: Internet Explorer 8 supports caret browsing.)	Yes	No (Note: Mouse gesture support is available via plug-ins, i.e. Mouse Gestures for Internet Explorer or Easy Go Back.)	Yes	Yes	Dropped
K-Meleon	Yes	Yes	No	Disabled		Yes	No	No	
Konqueror	Yes	Yes	Yes	Yes	Yes	Yes (Note: Mouse gesture support is available system-wide in KDE)	Depends (Note: Text-to speech support depends on the kttsd application in the kdeaccessibility package.)	No	
Ladybird	Yes	Yes	?	?	?	No	No	No	No
Links	Yes	Yes	?	Yes		Yes	No	No	
Lunascape	No	No	No	Yes		Yes	No	No	
Lynx	No	No	Yes	No	No	No	No	No	
Maxthon	Yes	Yes	Yes	Yes		Yes	No	No	
Midori	Yes	Yes	Yes	No		Yes	No	No	
Mosaic	No	No	No	No		No	No	No	
Netscape Navigator	Yes	Yes	No	Yes		No	No	No	
NetSurf	No	Yes	No	No		No	No	No	
OmniWeb	Yes	Yes	No	No		No	Yes	Yes	
Opera	Yes	Yes	Yes	No	Yes	Yes	Yes	Yes	Dropped
Pale Moon	Yes	Yes	No	Yes	Yes	No	No	Yes	
Safari	Yes	Yes	Yes	Yes (Note: Only Mac.) (Note: On macOS systems, caret navigation (called "Full Keyboard Access") can be enabled systemwide.)	No	Yes	Yes	Yes	?
SeaMonkey	Yes	Yes	No	Yes	Yes	No (Note: Mouse gesture support can be added by installing extensions like Mouse Gestures Suite (Seamonkey-only) .)	No	No	
Shiira	?	Yes	Yes	Yes		No	Yes	No	
Sleipnir	Yes	Yes	No	No		Yes	No	No	
surf	?	Yes	No	Yes	No	No	No	No	
Torch Browser	Yes	Yes	Yes	Yes		No	No	No	
WorldWideWeb	?	?	?	?		No	No	No	
w3m	?	Yes	Yes	Yes		No	No	No	
Browser	Access keys	Tabbing navigation	Spatial navigation	Caret navigation	Smart bookmarks	Mouse gesture	Text-to-speech	Voice control	Can disable font smoothing

== Web technology support ==
Information about what web standards, and technologies the browsers support, except for JavaScript. External links lead to information about support in future versions of the browsers or extensions that provide such functionality.

Browser	CSS2.1 (Note: CSS 2, a W3C recommendation since 1998, is the current stable version of CSS, nevertheless, CSS 2.1 corrects a few errors in CSS2 (the most important being a new definition of the height/width of absolutely positioned elements, more influence for HTML's "style" attribute and a new calculation of the 'clip' property), and adds a few highly requested features which have already been widely implemented. CSS 2.1 is derived from and is intended to replace CSS 2. Conformance criteria are detailed at the W3C website. (CSS 3 is only in draft status at present.) For more detailed information please see comparison of layout engines (CSS).)	Frames (Note: Frames and frame sets are obsolete and non-conforming in HTML5. They should not be used by authors.)	Nav LINKs (Note: LINK as a navigational aid, as distinct from non-navigational uses of LINK.)	XSLT	XHTML (Note: XHTML is based on HTML but is an application of XML, which means that XHTML must be stricter than equivalent HTML code. XHTML is meant to be read by an XML parser but for backward compatibility reasons can also be parsed as HTML; this table only notes the browsers that are able to parse XHTML as XML. For more detailed information please see comparison of layout engines (XHTML).)	MathML	HTML 5 form elements
Amaya	Yes	No	?	No	Yes	Yes	No
AOL Explorer	Partial	Yes	No	Yes	No	No (Note: Available with the MathPlayer plugin.)	No
Avast Secure Browser	Yes	Yes	No	Yes	Yes	No	No
Arora	Yes	Yes	No	Yes	Yes	Yes	No
Basilisk	Yes	Yes	No	Yes	Yes	Yes	Yes
Brave	Yes	Yes	No	Yes	Yes	Yes	Yes
Camino	Yes	Yes	No	Yes	Yes	Yes	No
Chrome	Yes	Yes	No	Yes	Yes	Yes	Yes
Dillo	Partial	Partial (Note: Dillo displays frames as links that the user can click on.)	No	No	No	No	No
Dooble	Yes	Yes	No	Yes	Yes	Yes	Yes
Edge	Yes	Yes	No	Yes	Yes	Yes	Yes
ELinks	Partial	Yes	?	No	No	No	No
Falkon	Yes	Yes	?	Yes	Yes	No	Yes
Firefox	Yes	Yes	No (Note: Not in standard install, but provided by extension. Archived 14 July 2008 at the Wayback Machine Archived 13 May 2008 at the Wayback Machine)	Yes	Yes	Yes	Yes
Flock	Yes	Yes	?	Yes	Yes	Yes	No
Galeon	Yes	Yes	?	Yes	Yes	Yes	No
GNOME Web	Yes	Yes	No	Yes	Yes	Yes	No
iCab	Yes	Yes	Yes	No	No	No	No
Internet Explorer	Yes (Note: Microsoft claims Internet Explorer 8 has full CSS2.1 support, however independent testing revealed several bugs.)	Yes	No	Yes	Yes	No	No
Internet Explorer for Mac	Partial	Yes	?	Partial	Yes	No	No
K-Meleon	Yes	Yes	?	Yes	Yes	Yes	No
Konqueror	Yes	Yes	Yes	No	Yes	No	Yes
Ladybird	Yes	Yes	?	No	No	No	Yes
Links	No	Yes	Yes	No	No	No	No
Lunascape	Yes (Note: Depends on the layout engine which is chosen: Trident or Gecko or WebKit.)	Yes	Depends	Yes	Yes	Yes	No
Lynx	No	Partial	Yes	No	No	No	No
Maxthon	Partial	Yes	?	Yes	No	No	No
Midori	Yes	Yes	No	Yes	Yes	No	No
Mosaic	No	No	?	No	No	No	No
Mozilla	Yes	Yes	Yes	Yes	Yes	Yes	No
Netscape	Yes	Yes	?	Yes	Yes	Yes	No
Netscape Browser	Depends (Note: Depends on the layout engine which is chosen: Trident or Gecko.)	Yes	?	Yes	Depends	Depends	No
Netscape Navigator	No	Yes	No	No	No	No	No
Netscape Navigator 9	Yes	Yes	No	Yes	Yes	Yes	No
NetSurf	Yes	Yes	No	No	No	No	No
OmniWeb	Yes	Yes	?	No	Yes	No	No
Opera	Yes	Yes	Yes	Yes	Yes	Yes	Yes
Pale Moon	Yes	Yes	No	Yes	Yes	Yes	Yes
Safari	Yes	Yes	Partial	Yes	Yes	Yes	Yes
SeaMonkey	Yes	Yes	Yes	Yes	Yes	Yes	Yes
Shiira	Yes	Yes	?	Yes	Yes	No	No
Sleipnir	Partial	Yes	No	Yes	No	No	Yes
surf	Yes	Yes	No	No	Yes	No	No
Torch Browser	Yes	Yes	No	Yes	Yes	No	No
WorldWideWeb	No	No	?	No	No	No	No
w3m	?	Yes	?	No	Yes	No	No
Browser	CSS2.1	Frames	Nav LINKs	XSLT	XHTML	MathML	HTML 5 form elements

== Plugins and syndicated content support ==
Information about what web standards, and technologies the browsers support. External links lead to information about support in future versions of the browsers or extensions that provide such functionality.

Browser	ActiveX (Note: Internet Explorer (and Shells) is the only browser to natively support the Component Object Model (popularly known as ActiveX). Most other browsers use the NPAPI plugin architecture. ActiveX is more powerful than NPAPI in terms of the control it affords over the browser, but it is specific to Windows whereas NPAPI is cross-platform. There is a third-party plugin that adds partial ActiveX support, that is available for certain older versions of Mozilla Suite, Mozilla Firefox and Netscape Navigator. The default settings in earlier versions of Internet Explorer allowed the automatic download, installation, and running of new ActiveX controls with minimal user intervention – this made it possible to use ActiveX on web pages to install viruses, spyware, etc. onto a user's computer.)	NPAPI	Java (Note: Java support is for built-in support by the browser without a plugin.)	Gears	RSS	Atom	other web feed
Amaya	No	?	?	No	No	No	?
AOL Explorer	Yes	No	?	No	Yes (Note: Internet Explorer 7 and later.)	Yes	?
Avast Secure Browser	No	Yes	Yes	No	No	No	?
Basilisk	No	Yes	Yes	Yes	Yes	Yes	?
Camino	No	Yes	?	?	Partial	Partial	?
Chrome	No	Dropped (Note: NPAPI and the Java-plugin were disabled by default in Chrome versions 42 and not supported in Chrome versions 45 and higher.)	Dropped	Dropped	No	No	?
Dillo	No	?	No	No	No	No	?
Edge	No	No	No	No	No	No	No
ELinks	No	No	No	No	No	No	No
Falkon	No	Yes	No	No	Yes	No	No
Firefox	No	Dropped	Dropped	Yes	Yes	Yes	?
Flock	No	Yes	No	Yes	Yes	Yes	?
Galeon	No	Yes	No	Yes	No	No	No
GNOME Web	No	Dropped	No	No	No (Note: RSS and ATOM feed autodetection in Epiphany depends on the Newsfeed extension which is included with Epiphany-extensions.)	No	No
iCab	No	Yes	?	?	Yes	No	?
Internet Explorer	Yes	Dropped (Note: Internet Explorer did for a time support NPAPI plugins. Plugins that functioned in the Netscape browser also functioned in Internet Explorer. This was due to a small ActiveX control implemented within a "plugin.ocx" file that acted as a shim between the ActiveX based browser and the NPAPI plugin. The IE browser would load the control and use it to host plugins specified within the page. However, Microsoft made the claim that the NPAPI plugins (or the IE implementation of the API) were a security issue and dropped support for them in version 5.5 SP2.)	No	Yes	Yes	Yes	Yes (Note: Internet Explorer 8 supports syndicated content in hAtom / hSlice microformat by the name of a feature known as Web Slices. Internet Explorer 4.0—7 supported CDF.)
Internet Explorer for Mac	No	Yes	?	No	No	No	No
K-Meleon	No	Yes	No	?	Yes	Yes	?
Konqueror	No	Yes	No	No	Yes (Note: RSS and ATOM feed autodetection in Konqueror depends on the aKregator package which is installed with kdepim.)	Yes	?
Ladybird	No	No	No	No	No	No	No
Links	No	No	No	No	No	No	No
Lynx	No	No	No	No	No	No	No
Maxthon	Yes	Yes	?	?	Yes	Yes	?
Mosaic	No	No	?	No	No	No	No
Mozilla	No	Yes	No	No	No	No	?
Netscape	No	Yes	No	No	No	No	?
Netscape Browser	No	Yes	No	No	Yes	Yes	?
Netscape Navigator	No	Yes	No	No	No	No	?
Netscape Navigator 9	No	Yes	No	No	Yes	Yes	?
NetSurf	No	No	No	No	No	No	No
OmniWeb	No	?	?	?	Yes	Yes	?
Opera	No	Dropped	No	No	Dropped	Dropped	No
Pale Moon	No	Yes	Yes	Yes	Yes	Yes	?
Safari	No	Dropped	No (Note: Safari had Java only on macOS, up to Safari 11. No longer supported Safari for Windows needed a plugin.)	Partial (Note: Safari has Gears only on Mac OS X 10.4+. Windows is not supported.)	Dropped	No	?
SeaMonkey	No	Dropped	No	Yes	Yes	Yes	?
Shiira	No	?	?	?	Yes	Yes	?
Sleipnir	Yes	?	?	Yes	Yes	Yes	?
surf	No	Yes	No	No	No	No	No
WorldWideWeb	No	No	No	No	No	No	No
w3m	No	No	No	No	No	No	No
Browser	ActiveX	NPAPI	Java	Gears	RSS	Atom	other web feed

== JavaScript support ==
Information about what JavaScript technologies the browsers support. Note that although XPath is used by XSLT, it is only considered here if it can be accessed using JavaScript. External links lead to information about support in future versions of the browsers or extensions that provide such functionality, e.g., Babel.

Browser	JavaScript	ECMAScript 3	DOM 1	DOM 2	DOM 3	XPath	XMLHttpRequest	Rich editing
Amaya	No (Note: It is possible to compile Amaya with JavaScript enabled, using the CVS version and SpiderMonkey. However, this is still experimental and only a small subset of DOM 1 is available.)	No	No	No	No	No	No	No
AOL Explorer	Yes	Yes	Partial	Yes	No	No	Yes	Yes
Avast Secure Browser	Yes	Yes	Yes	Yes	Yes	Yes	Yes	Yes
Basilisk	Yes	Yes	Yes	Yes	Partial (Note: XPath is a part of DOM 3, but is considered separately here. A large subset of DOM 3 is accessible by extensions but not by websites.)	Yes	Yes	Yes
Camino	Yes	Yes	Yes	Yes	No	Yes	Yes	Yes
Chrome	Yes	Yes	Yes	Yes	Partial	Yes	Yes	Yes
Dillo	No	No	No	No	No	No	No	No
Edge	Yes	Yes	Yes	Yes	Partial	Yes	Yes	Yes
ELinks	Partial	Partial	No	No	No	No	No	No
Falkon	Yes	Yes	Yes	Yes	Partial	Yes	Yes	Yes
Firefox	Yes	Yes	Yes	Yes	Partial	Yes	Yes	Yes
Flock	Yes	Yes	Yes	Yes	No	Yes	Yes	Yes
Galeon	Yes	Yes	Yes	Yes	No	Yes	Yes	Yes
GNU IceCat	Partial (Note: Determined by GNU LibreJS.)	See Firefox ESR	See Firefox ESR	See Firefox ESR	See Firefox ESR	See Firefox ESR	See Firefox ESR	See Firefox ESR
iCab	Yes	Yes	Partial	Partial	No	No	Yes	No
Internet Explorer	Yes	Yes	Yes	Yes (Note: Internet Explorer 5 and above has its own event registration model and its own style sheets model, but these are incompatible with DOM 2.)	Yes	Yes	Yes	Yes
Internet Explorer for Mac	Yes	Yes	Partial	No	No	No	No	No
K-Meleon	Yes	Yes	Yes	Yes	No	Yes	Yes	Yes
Konqueror	Yes	Yes	Yes	Yes	Partial	No	Yes	No
Ladybird	Yes	Partial	Yes	Yes	Yes	No	Yes	Yes
Links	No (Note: Support for JavaScript has been removed in version 2.1pre29 (change log))	No	No	No	No	No	No	No
Lynx	No	No	No	No	No	No	No	No
Maxthon	Yes	Yes	Partial	No	No	Yes	Yes	Yes
Midori	Yes	Yes	Yes	Yes	Partial (Note: SVG, XPath, (partial) DOM 3 is available in only the WebKit nightlies so far.)	Yes	Yes	Yes
Mosaic	No	No	No	No	No	No	No	No
Mozilla	Yes	Yes	Yes	Yes	No	Yes	Yes	Yes
Netscape	Yes	Yes	Yes	Yes	No	Yes	Yes	Yes
Netscape Browser	Yes	Yes	Depends (Note: Depends on the layout engine which is chosen: Trident or Gecko.)	Depends	No	Depends	Yes	Yes
Netscape Navigator	Yes	Partial	No	No	No	No	No	No
Netscape Navigator 9	Yes	Yes	Yes	Yes	No	Yes	Yes	Yes
NetSurf	No	No	No	No	No	No	No	No
OmniWeb	Yes	Yes	Yes	Yes	No	No	Yes	No
Opera	Yes	Yes	Yes	Yes	Partial	Yes	Yes	Yes
Pale Moon	Yes	Yes	Yes	Yes	Partial	Yes	Yes	Yes
Safari	Yes	Yes	Yes	Yes	Partial	Yes	Yes	Yes
SeaMonkey	Yes	Yes	Yes	Yes	No	Yes	Yes	Yes
Shiira	Yes	Yes	Yes	Yes	No	No	Yes	Yes
Sleipnir	Yes	Yes	Partial	No	No	Yes	Yes	Yes
surf	Yes	Yes	Yes	Yes	No	Yes	Yes	Yes
Web	Yes	Yes	Yes	Yes	No	Yes	Yes	Yes
WorldWideWeb	No	No	No	No	No	No	No	No
w3m	No	No	No	No	No	No	No	No
Browser	JavaScript	ECMAScript 3	DOM 1	DOM 2	DOM 3	XPath	XMLHttpRequest	Rich editing

See what parts of DOM your browser supports

== Protocol support ==
Information about what Internet protocols the browsers support (in addition to HTTP that all (modern) browser should and do fully support (Note: Mosaic reached only HTTP 0.9 compliance, and does not support secure communications in any way.)). External links lead to information about support in future versions of the browsers or extensions that provide such functionality.

More than half of web traffic from Chrome to Google's servers is handled by QUIC protocol, not TCP (or HTTP/1). Chrome, Opera, and Firefox have support for QUIC, and HTTP/3, while Safari is testing it for a subset of users.

Browser	HTTP/2	FTP (Note: Many browsers have FTP support as read-only and have no upload capitilies. Read-only is marked as yes. For a comparison of clients that support upload opportunities see Comparison of FTP client software.)	NNTP (Note: Many browsers have purposely avoided support for e-mail and newsgroups (Usenet), as these are reserved for their mail-client counterparts. For a comparison of such counterparts see comparison of email clients and Comparison of Usenet newsreaders.)	SSL	EV	IRC	Gopher	IDN	data:URI	BitTorrent	IPv6	Proxy	DoH
Amaya	No	No	No	No	No	No	No	Yes	No	No	?	?	?
AOL Explorer	No	Yes	No	Yes (Note: Support for 256-bit ciphers (AES for example) for SSL/TLS is only available in Windows Vista and above)	Yes	No	No (Note: Internet Explorer 7 has no support of gopher; gopher support is disabled in IE6.)	No	No	No	Yes	?	?
Avast Secure Browser	Yes	No	No	Yes	Yes	No	No	Yes	Yes	No	Yes	Yes	Yes
Basilisk	Yes	Yes	No (Note: NNTP support can be added by installing the add-on infoRSS.)	Yes	Yes	No (Note: IRC support can be added by installing ChatZilla.)	No	Yes (Note: For security reasons, IDN domains are displayed as punycode if they contain certain characters or if the top-level domain has not been whitelisted .)	Yes	No (Note: Possible using third party extensions like FoxTorrent)	Yes	Yes	?
Camino	No	Yes	No	Yes	?	No	Yes	Yes	Yes	No	Yes	?	?
Chrome	Yes	No	No	Yes	Yes	No	No	Yes	Yes	No	Yes	Yes	Yes
Dillo	?	Yes	No	No (Note: Dillo has experimental SSL integration that is by standard turned off. "How do I enable the https (SSL) support plugin for dillo?". Archived from the original on 9 May 2008. There is no certificate caching and no authentication performed.)	No	No	No	No	Yes	No	Yes	?	?
Edge	Yes	No	No	Yes	Yes	No	No	Yes	Yes	No	Yes	Yes	Yes
ELinks	No	Yes	Yes	Yes	No	No	Yes	Yes	Yes	Yes	Yes	Partial (Note: Respects system-wide proxy settings.)	?
Falkon	?	Yes	No	Yes	Yes	No	No	Yes	Yes	No	Yes	Yes	?
Firefox	Yes	No	No	Yes	Yes	No	Dropped (Note: Firefox support for the Gopher protocol was dropped in Firefox 4 (Gecko 1.9.3) per bug 388195. This and newer versions have full Gopher support when the OverbiteFF extension is installed.)	Yes	Yes	No	Yes	Yes	Yes
Flock	No	Yes	No	Yes	?	No	Yes	Yes	Yes	No	Yes	?	?
Galeon	No	Yes	No	Yes	Yes	No	Yes	Yes	Yes	No	Yes	Yes	?
GNOME Web	?	No	No	Yes	Yes	No	No	Yes	Yes	No	Yes	Partial	?
iCab	?	Yes	No	Yes	?	No	No	Yes	No	No	Yes	?	?
Internet Explorer	Yes	Yes	No	Yes	Yes	No	Dropped	Yes	Partial (Note: Microsoft has limited support to certain "non-navigable" content, such as in <img> tags and CSS rules, for security reasons, including concerns that JavaScript embedded in a data URI may not be interpretable by script filters such as those used by web-based email clients.)	No	Yes	Yes	No
Internet Explorer for Mac	No	Yes	No	Yes	No	No	Yes	No	No	No	?	?	?
K-Meleon	No	Yes	No	Yes	No	No	Yes	Yes	Yes	No	Yes	Yes	?
Konqueror	?	Yes	No	Yes	No	No	No (Note: Konqueror has full Gopher support when the kgopher KIO plugin is installed.)	Yes	Yes	Yes	Yes	Yes	?
Ladybird	Yes	No	No	Yes	Yes	No	No	Yes	Yes	No	Yes	?	Yes
Links	No	Yes	No	Yes	No	No	No	Yes	Yes	No	Yes	Yes	No
Lynx	No	Yes	Yes	Yes	No	No	Yes	No	No	No	Yes	Partial	?
Maxthon	No	Yes	No	Yes	Yes	No	No	Yes	No	No	Yes	Yes	?
Mosaic	No	Yes	Yes	No	No	No	Yes	No	No	No	No	?	?
Mozilla	No	Yes	Yes	Yes	No	Yes	Yes	Yes	Yes	No	No	Yes	?
Netscape	No	Yes	Yes	Yes	No	No	Yes	Yes	Yes	No	?	?	?
Netscape Browser	No	Yes	No	Yes	No	No	Depends (Note: Depends on the layout engine which is chosen: Trident or Gecko.)	Depends	Depends	No	?	?	?
Netscape Navigator	No	Yes	Yes	Yes	No	No	Yes	No	No	No	?	?	?
Netscape Navigator 9	No	Yes	No	Yes	No	No	Yes	Yes	Yes	No	Yes	?	?
NetSurf	No	Yes	No	Yes	No	No	No	No	Yes	No	Yes	?	?
OmniWeb	No	Yes	No	Yes	?	No	Yes	Yes	Yes	No	Yes	?	?
Opera	Yes	Yes	Dropped	Yes	Yes	Dropped	No (Note: Includes a proxy capability for gopher support.)	Yes	Yes	Dropped	Yes	Yes	Yes
Pale Moon	Yes	Yes	No	Yes	Yes	No	No	Yes	Yes	No	Yes	Yes	?
Safari	Yes	Partial	No	Yes	Yes	No	No	Yes	Yes	No	Yes	Yes	Yes
SeaMonkey	Yes	Yes	Yes	Yes	Yes	Yes	Yes	Yes	Yes	No	Yes	Yes	?
Shiira	No	?	?	Yes	?	No	No	Yes	?	No	Yes	?	?
Sleipnir	?	Yes	No	Yes	Yes	No	No	Yes	No	No	Yes	?	?
surf	?	No	No	Partial (Note: Behavior towards malicious certificates can only be set up in compile time.)	Partial	No	No	Yes	Yes	No	Yes	Partial	?
WorldWideWeb	No	Yes	Yes	No	No	No	No	No	No	No	No	?	?
w3m	?	Yes	No	Yes	?	No	Yes	?	?	No	Yes	?	?
Browser	HTTP/2	FTP	NNTP	SSL	EV	IRC	Gopher	IDN	data:URI	BitTorrent	IPv6	Proxy	DoH

== Image format support ==
Information about what image formats the browsers support. External links lead to information about support in future versions of the browsers or extensions that provide such functionality.

Browser	JPEG	JPEG 2000	JPEG XR	WebP	GIF	PNG	APNG	TIFF (Note: Although it was one of the first suggested WWW image formats, most browsers support TIFF by using a plugin installed by the user instead of decoding it natively.)	SVG (Note: SVG here refers to SVG 1.1 Full. There are also two simplified profiles known as SVG 1.1 Tiny and SVG 1.1 Basic, which are intended for user agents with limited capabilities.)	PDF (Note: Most browsers support PDF by installing an Adobe plugin which takes over the browser window. Listed here are browsers which also support inline PDFs within other hypertext documents (such as within HTML's <img /> tag). Note that PDF (in strictly speaking) is not an image format, but a scriptable rich text document format that can contain different types of multimedia content, including vector and bitmap graphics, audio, video, forms, intra- and inter-document hypertext links and a hierarchical contents listing. The format is also the native display format under macOS.)	2D Canvas	XBM	BMP	ICO	HEIF
Amaya	Yes	?	No	?	Yes	Yes	No	Yes	Partial	No	No	?	?	?	?
AOL Explorer	Yes	No	No	No	Yes	Partial (Note: Internet Explorer supports PNG images but is unable to correctly display images with gamma correction or color correction. Versions of Internet Explorer prior to version 7 are unable to correctly display images with alpha channel (for transparency) without additional coding .)	No	disable	No	No	No (Note: Support for the canvas element was added to Internet Explorer 9. Earlier versions of Internet Explorer can be made to emulate canvas using the excanvas script.)	No (Note: Internet Explorer support for XBM files was removed in Version 6.)	?	?	?
Avast Secure Browser	Yes	No	Yes	Yes	Yes	Yes	Yes	Yes	Partial	Yes	Yes	No	Yes	Yes	No
Basilisk	Yes	No	Yes	Yes	Yes	Yes	Yes	No	Partial	Yes	Yes	No	Yes	Yes	?
Camino	Yes	No	No	?	Yes	Yes	No	No	Partial (Note: Firefox and SeaMonkey partially support SVG 1.1 Full. Modules that are implemented or not implemented and details of their implementation: .)	No	No	Yes	?	?	?
Chrome	Yes	PDF	No	Yes	Yes	Yes	Yes (Note: For Chromium prior to version 59 there is support via an extension.)	No	Partial	Yes	Yes	Dropped	Yes	Yes	No
Chromium	Yes	PDF	?	Yes	Yes	Yes	Yes	No	Partial	Yes	Yes	Dropped	Yes	Yes	No
Dillo	Yes	No	No	?	Yes	Yes	No	No	No	No	No	No	?	?	?
Edge	Yes	PDF	No	Yes	Yes	Yes	Yes	No	Partial	Yes	Yes	No	Yes	Yes	No
ELinks	No	No	No	No	No	No	No	No	No	No	No	No	?	?	?
Falkon	Yes	PDF	No	Yes	Yes	Yes	Yes	Yes	Partial (Note: Falkon supports as much SVG specification as WebKit does: .)	Yes	Yes	Yes	Yes	?	?
Firefox	Yes	PDF	No	Yes	Yes	Yes	Yes (Note: Mozilla applications rebranded by the GNU project, such as GNU IceCat or Iceape do not support APNG.)	No	Partial	Yes	Yes	Dropped (Note: In Gecko 1.9.2 (Firefox 3.6) XBM support was dropped.)	Yes	Yes	No
Flock	Yes	No	No	?	Yes	Yes	Dropped	No	Partial	No	Yes	Yes	?	?	?
Galeon	Yes	No	No	No	Yes	Yes	Yes	No	No	No	No	Yes	?	?	?
GNOME Web	Yes	Yes	No	?	Yes	Yes	Yes	No	Partial	Yes	Yes	Yes	?	?	?
iCab	Yes	?	No	?	Yes	Yes	Yes	No	No	Yes	No	?	?	?	?
Internet Explorer	Yes	No	Yes	No	Yes	Yes	No	Yes	Partial	No	Yes	Dropped	Yes	Yes	No
Internet Explorer for Mac	Yes	No	No	No	Yes	Yes	No	No	No	No	No	?	?	?	?
K-Meleon	Yes	No	No	?	Yes	Yes	Yes	No	Yes	No	No	?	Yes	?	?
Konqueror	Yes	Optional (Note: Konqueror supports JPEG2000 if KDE's viewer is compiled with Jasper library.)	No	?	Yes	Yes	No	No	Partial	Yes (Note: Inline PDF viewing in Konqueror requires KPDF which is included in kdegraphics.)	Yes	?	Yes	?	?
Ladybird	Yes	Yes	?	Yes	Yes	Yes	Yes	Yes	Yes	No	Yes	No	Yes	Yes	No
Links	Yes	No	No	Yes	Yes	Yes	No	Yes	No	No	No	Yes	?	?	?
Lynx	Yes/No (Note: While lacking support for inline display of graphical elements, Lynx allows defining standalone image viewer and assigning programs to MIME types. Such program is called when user activates corresponding element, effectively allowing Lynx user to add support for arbitrary non-inlined file format.)											No	Yes/No		
Maxthon	Yes	No	No	Yes	Yes	Yes	Yes	disable	Partial	No	Yes	No	Yes	?	?
Midori	Yes	Yes	No	?	Yes	Yes	Yes	No	Partial (Note: Safari 3 is able to render SVG documents, but not fully.)	No	Yes	Yes	?	?	?
Mosaic	Yes	No	No	No	Yes	Yes	No	No	No	No	No	Yes	?	?	?
Mozilla	Yes	No	No	No	Yes	Yes	No	No	No	No	No	Yes	?	?	?
Netscape	Yes	No	No	No	Yes	Yes	No	No	No	No	No	Yes	?	?	?
Netscape Browser	Yes	No	No	No	Yes	Depends (Note: Depends on the layout engine which is chosen: Trident or Gecko.)	No	No	No	No	No	Yes	?	?	?
Netscape Navigator	Yes	No	No	No	Partial	Partial (Note: 32-bit version only.)	No	No	No	No	No	Yes	?	?	?
Netscape Navigator 9	Yes	No	No	No	Yes	Yes	No	No	Partial	No	Yes	Yes	?	?	?
NetSurf	Yes	No	No	Yes	Yes	Yes	No	No	Partial	No	No	No	Yes	?	?
OmniWeb	Yes	Yes	No	?	Yes	Yes	No	Yes	Partial	No	No	Yes	?	?	?
Opera	Yes	PDF	No	Yes	Yes	Yes	Yes (Note: Opera is currently supporting APNG on their Beta and Dev builds.)	No	Partial (Note: Opera supports SVG 1.1 Basic. Deprecated link archived 4 June 2012 at archive.today)	Yes	Yes	Yes	Yes	Yes	?
Pale Moon	Yes	No	Yes (Note: Pale Moon supports JPEG-XR from the first quarter of 2017.)	Yes	Yes	Yes	Yes	No	Partial	No	Yes	No	Yes	Yes	?
Safari	Yes	Yes	No	Yes	Yes	Yes	Yes	Yes	Yes	Yes	Yes	Yes	Yes	?	Yes (Note: Safari support for HEIF pronounced in 2017 from version 11 on operating systems macOS Sierra and iOS 11.)
SeaMonkey	Yes	No	No	No	Yes	Yes	Yes	No	Partial	No (Note: With the addition of the new Cairo version in Gecko 1.9 it will be natively possible to save pages to PDFs but not read them. This feature is not included in Firefox 3.5, however it is possible with the new Cairo backend.)	Yes	Yes	Yes	?	?
Shiira	Yes	?	No	?	Yes	Yes	No	Yes	Partial	No	Partial	Yes	?	?	?
Sleipnir	Yes	No	No	?	Yes	Partial	No	disable	Partial	No	Yes	No	?	?	?
surf	Yes	Yes	No	?	Yes	Yes	No	No	Partial	No	Yes	Yes	Yes	?	?
Torch Browser	Yes	?	?	?	Yes	Yes	Yes	?	Partial	No	Yes	?	Yes	?	?
WorldWideWeb	Yes	No	No	No	Yes	No	No	Yes	No	No	No	?	?	?	?
w3m	Yes	No	No	No	Yes	Yes	No	?	?	?	No	?	?	?	?
Browser	JPEG	JPEG 2000	JPEG XR	WebP	GIF	PNG	APNG	TIFF	SVG	PDF	2D Canvas	XBM	BMP	ICO	HEIF

== Internationalization ==
Most browsers are available in more than one language.

Browser	Languages	Total
Amaya	English (en), French (fr), Finnish (fi), German (de), Italian (it), Portuguese (pt), Russian (ru), Spanish (es), Chinese (zh-CN and zh-TW), Turkish (tr), Slovak (sk), Russian (ru), Norwegian (no), Georgian (ka), Japanese (ja), Hungarian (hu), Dutch (du), Ukrainian (uk)	18
AOL Explorer	English (en), French (fr), German (de)	3
Avast Secure Browser	Arabic (ar), Portuguese (pt-BR), Bengali (bn), Bulgarian (bg), Catalan (ca), Chinese (zh-CN zh-TW), Croatian (hr), Czech (cs), Danish (da), Dutch (nl), English (en-US en-GB), Estonian (et), Filipino (fil), Finnish (fi), French (fr), German (de), Greek (el), Gujarati (gu), Hebrew (he), Hindi (hi), Hungarian (hu), Indonesian (id), Italian (it), Japanese (ja), Kanada (kn), Korean (ko), Latvian (lv), Lithuanian (lt), Malayalam (ml), Marathi (mr), Norwegian (no), Oriya (or), Polish (pl), Portuguese (pt), Romanian (ro), Russian (ru), Serbian (sr), Slovak (sk), Slovenian (sl), Spanish (es), Spanish (es-LA), Swedish (sv), Tamil (ta), Telugu (te), Thai (th), Turkish (tr), Ukrainian (uk), Vietnamese (vi)	48
Basilisk	American English (en-US)	1
Camino	Chinese (zh-CN, zh-TW), Czech (cs), Danish (da), Dutch (nl), English (en), French (fr), German (de), Italian (it), Japanese (ja), Lithuanian (lt), Norwegian (nb, and nn), Portuguese (pt), Slovak (sk), Spanish (es), Swedish (sv)	15
Chrome	Arabic (ar), Portuguese (pt-BR), Bengali (bn), Bulgarian (bg), Catalan (ca), Chinese (zh-CN zh-TW), Croatian (hr), Czech (cs), Danish (da), Dutch (nl), English (en-US en-GB), Estonian (et), Filipino (fil), Finnish (fi), French (fr), German (de), Greek (el), Gujarati (gu), Hebrew (he), Hindi (hi), Hungarian (hu), Indonesian (id), Italian (it), Japanese (ja), Kanada (kn), Korean (ko), Latvian (lv), Lithuanian (lt), Malayalam (ml), Marathi (mr), Norwegian (no), Oriya (or), Polish (pl), Portuguese (pt), Romanian (ro), Russian (ru), Serbian (sr), Slovak (sk), Slovenian (sl), Spanish (es), Spanish (es-LA), Swedish (sv), Tamil (ta), Telugu (te), Thai (th), Turkish (tr), Ukrainian (uk), Vietnamese (vi)	48
Dillo	English (en), Japanese (ja), Polish (pl), Russian (ru)	4
ELinks	Bulgarian (bg), Croatian (hr), Czech (cs), Danish (da), English (en), French (fr), German (de), Hungarian (hu), Italian (it), Polish (pl), Portuguese (pt), Slovak (sk), Ukrainian (uk)	13
Edge	Arabic (ar-SA), Bulgarian (bg-BG), Chinese (zh-CN, zh-HK, zh-TW), Croatian (hr-HR), Czech (cs-CZ), Danish (da-DK), Dutch (nl-NL), English (en-GB, en-US), Estonian (et-EE), Finnish (fi-FI), French (fr-FR, fr-CA), German (de-DE), Greek (el-GR), Hebrew (he-IL), Hungarian (hu-HU), Italian (it-IT), Japanese (ja-JP), Korean (ko-KR), Latvian (lv-LV), Lithuanian (lt-LT), Norwegian (no-nb-NO), Polish (pl-PL), Portuguese (pt-BR pt-PT), Romanian (ro-RO), Russian (ru-RU), Serbian (sr-Latn-SP), Slovak (sk-SK), Slovenian (sl-SI), Spanish (es-ES, es-MX), Swedish (sv-SE), Thai (th-TH), Turkish (tr-TR), Ukrainian (uk-UA)	33
Falkon	Arabic (ar), Basque (eu), Bulgarian (bg), Catalan (ca), Chinese (zh-CN, zh-TW), Croatian (hr), Czech (cz), Dutch (nl), English (en), Finnish (fi), French (fr), Galician (gl), Ganda (lg), Georgian (ka), German (de), Greek (el), Hebrew (he), Hungarian (hu), Indonesian (id), Italian (it), Japanese (ja), Latvian (lv), N'ko (nqo), Persian (fa), Polish (pl), Portuguese (pt-BR, and pt-PT), Romanian (ro), Russian (ru), Serbian (sr), Slovak (sk), Spanish (es), Swedish (sv), Turkish (tr), Ukrainian (uk), Uzbek (uz)	35
Firefox	Acholi (ach), Afrikaans (af), Akan (ak), Albanian (sq), Arabic (ar), Armenian (hy), Assamese (as), Asturian (ast), Azerbaijani (az), Basque (eu), Belarusian (be), Bengali (bn-IN, bn-BD) (bn), Bosnian (bs), Breton (br), Bulgarian (bg), Catalan (ca), Chinese (zh-CN, zh-TW), Croatian (hr), Czech (cs), Danish (da), Dutch (nl), English (en-GB, en-US, and en-ZA) (en), Esperanto (eo), Estonian (et), Finnish (fi), Fula (ff), French (fr), Frisian (fy), Friulian (fur), Gaelic (gd), Galician (gl), Georgian (ka), German (de), Greek (el), Gujarati (gu), Hebrew (he), Hindi (hi), Hungarian (hu), Icelandic (is), Indonesian (id), Irish (ga), Italian (it), Japanese (ja), Kannada (kn), Kashubian (csb), Khmer (km), Kazakh (kk), Korean (ko), Kurdish (ku), Latvian (lv), Ligurian (lig), Lithuanian (lt), Luganda (lg), Macedonian (mk), Maithili (mai), Malay (ms), Malayalam (ml), Marathi (mr), Northern Sotho (nso), Norwegian (no-nb, no-nn), Occitan (oc), Oriya (or), Persian (fa), Polish (pl), Portuguese (pt-BR, pt-PT), Punjabi (pa), Romanian (ro), Romansh (rm), Russian (ru), Serbian (sr), Sinhala (si), Slovak (sk), Slovenian (sl), Songhai (son), Spanish (es-AR, es-CL, es-MX, es-ES) (es), Swedish (sv), Tamil (ta), Tamil (ta-LK) (ta), Tatar (tt), Telugu (te), Thai (th), Turkish (tr), Ukrainian (uk), Vietnamese (vi), Welsh (cy), Zulu (zu)	91
Flock	Arabic (ar), Chinese (zh-CN, zh-TW), English (en), Finnish (fi), French (fr), Georgian (ka), German (de), Hungarian (hu), Korean (ko), Polish (pl), Portuguese (pt-PT), Russian (ru), Slovak (sk), Spanish (es-AR, and es-ES)	14
Galeon	Amharic (am), Azerbaijani (az), Belarusian (be), Bulgarian (bg), Bosnian (bs), Catalan (ca), Czech (cs), Danish (da), German (de), Greek (el), English (en), Spanish (es), Estonian (et), Basque (eu), Finnish (fi), French (fr), Irish (ga), Galician (gl), Croatian (hr), Hungarian (hu), Italian (it), Japanese (ja), Korean (ko), Lithuanian (lt), Latvian (lv), Macedonian (mk), Malayalam (ml), Mongolian (mn), Malay (ms), Dutch (nl), Norwegian (no-nb, no-nn), Punjabi (pa), Polish (pl), Portuguese (pt), Romanian (ro), Russian (ru), Kinyarwanda (rw), Slovak (sk), Slovenian (sl), Albanian (sq), Serbian (sr), Swedish (sv), Tamil (ta), Turkish (tr), Ukrainian (uk), Vietnamese (vi), Walloon (wa), Chinese (zh-TW)	48
GNOME Web	Amharic (am), Arabic (ar), Azerbaijani (az), Belarusian (be), Belarusian (be-Latn), Bulgarian (bg), Bengali (bn), Bosnian (bs), Catalan (ca), Czech (cs), Welsh (cy), Danish (da), German (de), Dzongkha (dz), Greek (el), English (en), Spanish (es), Estonian (et), Basque (eu), Persian (fa), Finnish (fi), French (fr), Irish (ga), Galician (gl), Gujarati (gu), Hebrew (he), Hindi (hi), Croatian (hr), Hungarian (hu), Indonesian (id), Icelandic (is), Italian (it), Japanese (ja), Georgian (ka), Korean (ko), Kurdish (ku), Limburgian (li), Lithuanian (lt), Latvian (lv), Malagasy (mg), Maori (mi), Macedonian (mk), Malayalam (ml), Mongolian (mn), Marathi (mr), Malay (ms), Norwegian (Bokmål) (nb), Norwegian (Nynorsk) (nn), Nepali (ne), Dutch (nl), Oriya (or), Punjabi (pa), Polish (pl), Portuguese (pt), Romanian (ro), Russian (ru), Kinyarwanda (rw), Slovak (sk), Slovenian (sl), Albanian (sq), Serbian (sr), Swedish (sv), Tamil (ta), Telugu (te), Thai (th), Turkmen (tk), Turkish (tr), Ukrainian (uk), Vietnamese (vi), Walloon (wa), Chinese (zh)	70
iCab	German (de), English (en), Japanese (ja), Danish (da), French (fr), Spanish (es), Russian (ru), Norwegian (no), Chinese (zh-CN)	9
Internet Explorer	Afrikaans (af), Albanian (sq), Amharic (am), Arabic (ar), Armenian (hy), Assamese (as), Azeri (az), Bengali (bn-BD, and bd-IN)) (bn), Basque (eu), Bosnian (bs-Latn), Bulgarian (bg), Catalan (ca), Chinese (zh-HK, zh-CN, zh-TW), Croatian (hr), Czech (cs), Danish (da), Dari (af-FA), Dutch (nl), English (en), Estonian (et), Filipino (fil), Finnish (fi), French (fr), Galician (gl), Georgian (ka), German (de), Greek (el), Gujarati (gu), Hausa (ha), Hebrew (he), Hindi (hi), Hungarian (hu), Icelandic (is), Igbo (ig), Indonesian (id), Irish (ga), Italian (it), Japanese (ja), Kannada (kn), Kazakh (kk), Khmer (km), KiSwahili (sw), Konkani (kok), Korean (ko), Kyrgyz (ky), Latvian (lv), Lithuanian (lt), Luxembourgish (lb), Macedonian (mk), Malay (ms-BN, ms-My), Malayalam (ml), Maltese (mt), Maori (mi), Marathi (mr), Mongolian (mn), Nepali (ne), Norwegian (no-nb, no-nn), Oriya (or), Persian (fa), Polish (pl), Portuguese (pt-BR, pt-PT), Punjabi (pa), Quechua (qu), Romanian (ro), Russian (ru), Serbian (sr-Cyrl-BA, sr-Cyrl-RS, sr-Latn), Sesotho (st), Setswana (tn), Sinhala (si), Slovak (sk), Slovenian (sl), Spanish (es), Swedish (sv), Tamil (ta), Tatar (tt), Telugu (te), Thai (th), Turkish (tr), Turkmen (tk), Ukrainian (uk), Urdu (ur), Uzbek (uz), Vietnamese (vi), Welsh (cy), Yoruba (yo), isiXhosa (kh), isiZulu (zu)	95
Internet Explorer for Mac	German (de), English (en), Spanish (es), French (fr), Italian (it), Japanese (ja), Swedish (sv)	7
K-Meleon	Chinese (zh-CN), English (en), French (fr), German (de), Spanish (es), Russian (ru)	6
Konqueror	Afrikaans (af), Arabic (ar), Belarusian (be), Bulgarian (bg), Bengali (bn), Bosnian (bs), Catalan (ca), Chinese (zh, zh-CN), Czech (cs), Welsh (cy), Danish (da), German (de), Greek (el), English (en), Esperanto (eo), Spanish (es), Estonian (et), Basque (eu), Persian (fa), Finnish (fi), French (fr), Galician (gl), Hebrew (he), Hindi (hi), Croatian (hr), Hungarian (hu), Icelandic (is), Italian (it), Japanese (ja), Mongolian (mn), Malay (ms), Dutch (nl), Norwegian (no-nn, no-nb), Punjabi (pa), Polish (pl), Portuguese (pt), Romanian (ro), Russian (ru), Slovak (sk), Slovenian (sl), Serbian (sr), Swedish (sv), Tamil (ta), Tajik (tg), Turkish (tr), Ukrainian (uk), Uzbek (uz)	46
Ladybird	American English (en-US)	1
Links	Belarusian (be), Portuguese (pt-BR), Bulgarian (bg), Catalan (ca), Croatian (hr), Czech (cs), Danish (da), Dutch (nl), English (en), Estonian (et), Finnish (fi), French (fr), Galician (gl), German (de), Greek (el), Hungarian (hu), Icelandic (is), Indonesian (id), Italian (it), Lithuanian (lt), Norwegian (no), Polish (pl), Portuguese (pt), Romanian (ro), Russian (ru), Serbian (sr), Slovak (sk), Spanish (es), Swedish (sv), Turkish (tr), Ukrainian (uk), Upper Sorbian (hsb)	32
Lunascape	Chinese (zh-CN, zn-TW), English (en), French (fr), German (de), Italian (it), Japanese (ja), Korean (ko), Portuguese (pt), Russian (ru), Spanish (es)	10
Lynx	Catalan (ca), Czech (cs), Danish (da), German (de), Estonian (et), English (en), French (fr), Hungarian (hu), Italian (it), Japanese (ja), Dutch (nl), Portuguese (Brazilian) (pt-BR), Russian (ru), Kinyarwanda (rw), Slovenian (sl), Swedish (sv), Turkish (tr), Ukrainian (uk), Vietnamese (vi), Chinese (zh-CN, zh-TW)	21
Maxthon	Arabic (ar), Basque (eu), Bosnian (bs), Belarusian (be), Bulgarian (bg), Chinese (zh), Croatian (hr), Czech (cs), Danish (da), Dutch (nl), English (en), Estonian (et), Persian (fa), Finnish (fi), French (fr), Frisian (stq), Galician (gl), German (de), Greek (el), Hebrew (he), Hungarian (hu), Italian (it-IT, it-RM, it-MI) (it), Japanese (ja), Korean (ko), Lithuanian (lt), Malay (ms), Norwegian (no), Piedmontese (pms), Polish (pl), Portuguese (pt), Portuguese (Brazilian) (pt), Romanian (ro), Russian (ru), Serbian (sr-Cyrl, sr-Latn), Slovak (sk), Slovenian (sl), Spanish (es), Spanish (es-AR), Swedish (sv), Thai (th), Turkish (tr), Ukrainian (uk), Vietnamese (vi)	44
Mosaic	English (en)	1
Mozilla	Catalan (ca), Chinese (zh), Czech (cs), Danish (da), English (en), Finnish (fi), French (fr), German (de), Greek (el), Hebrew (he), Irish (ga), Italian (it), Japanese (ja), Korean (ko), Lithuanian (lt), Macedonian (mk), Norwegian (no), Polish (pl), Portuguese (pt), Punjabi (pa), Romanian (ro), Russian (ru), Slovak (sk), Slovenian (sl), Spanish (es), Swedish (sv), Turkish (tr), Welsh (cy)	28
Netscape	Chinese (zh), English (en), French (fr), German (de), Japanese (ja), Portuguese (pt), Spanish (es)	7
Netscape Browser	English (en), English (Canadian) (en)	2
Netscape Navigator	Portuguese (pt-BR), Chinese (zh), Czech (cs), English (en), Danish (da), Finnish (fi), French (fr), German (de), Greek (el), Hungarian (hu), Italian (it), Japanese (ja), Korean (ko), Norwegian (no), Polish (pl), Russian (ru), Slovenian (sl), Spanish (es), Swedish (sv), Turkish (tr)	20
Netscape Navigator 9	English (en)	1
NetSurf	Dutch (nl), English (en), French (fr), German (de)	4
OmniWeb	Danish (da), Dutch (nl), English (en), French (fr), German (de), Japanese (ja), Swedish (sv)	7
Opera	Afrikaans (af), Azerbaijani (az), Belarusian (be), Bengali (bn), Bulgarian (bg), Chinese (zh-CN, zh-TW), Croatian (hr), Czech (cs), Danish (da), Dutch (nl), English (en-GB, en-US), Estonian (et), Finnish (fi), French (fr-FR, fr-CA), Frisian (fy), Georgian (ka), German (de), Greek (el), Hindi (hi), Hungarian (hu), Indonesian (id), Italian (it), Japanese (ja), Korean (ko), Lithuanian (lt), Macedonian (mk), Malay (ms), Montenegrin (mis), Norwegian (no-nb, no-nn), Polish (pl), Portuguese (pt, pt-BR), Punjabi (pa), Romanian (ro), Russian (ru), Serbian (sr), Slovak (sk), Spanish (es-ES, es-LA), Swedish (sv), Tagalog (tl), Tamil (ta), Thai (th), Telugu (te), Turkish (tr), Ukrainian (uk), Uzbek (uz), Vietnamese (vi), Zulu (zu)	47
Pale Moon	Arabic (ar), Bulgarian (bg), Traditional Chinese (zh-TW), Simplified Chinese (zh-CN), Croatian (hr), Czech (cs), Danish (da), Dutch (nl), American English (en-US), British English (en-GB), Filipino (tl), Finnish (fi), French (fr), Galician (gl), Greek (el), Hungarian (hu), Indonesian (id), Italian (it), Icelandic (is), Japanese (ja), Korean (ko), Polish (pl), Brazilian Portuguese (pt-BR), European Portuguese (pt-PT), Romanian (ro), Russian (ru) Argentine Spanish (es-AR), Mexican Spanish (es-M), Serbian [Cyrillic] (sr), Castilian Spanish (es-ES), Slovak (sk), Slovenian (sl), Swedish (sv-SE), Thai (th), Turkish (tr), Ukrainian (uk)	37
Safari	Catalan (ca), Dutch (nl), English (en), French (fr), German (de), Italian (it), Japanese (ja), Spanish (es), Danish (da), Finnish (fi), Korean (ko), Norwegian (no), Portuguese (pt), Russian (ru), Swedish (sv), Chinese (zh)	15
SeaMonkey	Belarusian (be), Catalan (ca), Chinese (zh-CN), Czech (cs), Dutch (nl), English (en-GB, en-US), Finnish (fi), French (fr), Galician (gl), Georgian (ka), German (de), Hungarian (hu), Italian (it), Japanese (ja), Lithuanian (lt), Norwegian (no), Polish (pl), Portuguese (pt), Russian (ru), Slovak (sk), Spanish (es-ES, es-LA), Swedish (sv), Turkish (tr)	37
Shiira	Chinese (zh-CN, zh-TW), Danish (da), Dutch (nl), English (en), Finnish (fi), French (fr), German (de), Italian (it), Korean (ko), Norwegian (no), Polish (pl), Portuguese (pt), Slovak (sk), Spanish (es), Swedish (sv)	15
Sleipnir	Chinese (zh-CN, zh-TW), English (en), Japanese (ja)	3
SRWare Iron	English (en), German (de), Russian (ru)	3
surf	Browser lacks user interface elements to be translated; see WebKitGTK+ for status of engine messages' translation.	0
Torch Browser	English (en), French (fr), Spanish es), Turkish (tr), Italian (it), Portuguese (pt), German (de)	7
WorldWideWeb	English (en)	1
w3m	English (en), French (fr), German (de), Italian (it), Japanese (ja), Spanish (es), Polish (pl), Portuguese (pt), Swedish (sv)	9
Browser	Languages	Total

== See also ==
- History of the web browser
- List of web browsers
- Comparison of browser engines
- Comparison of lightweight web browsers
- Version history for TLS/SSL support in web browsers
- Usage share of web browsers
- Comparison of download managers
- Browser security
- Browser wars
- HTML video browser support
- HTML audio supported audio coding formats
