= Shiira =

Web browser

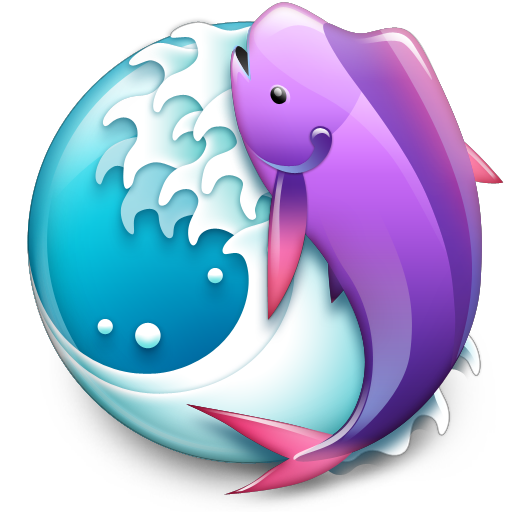

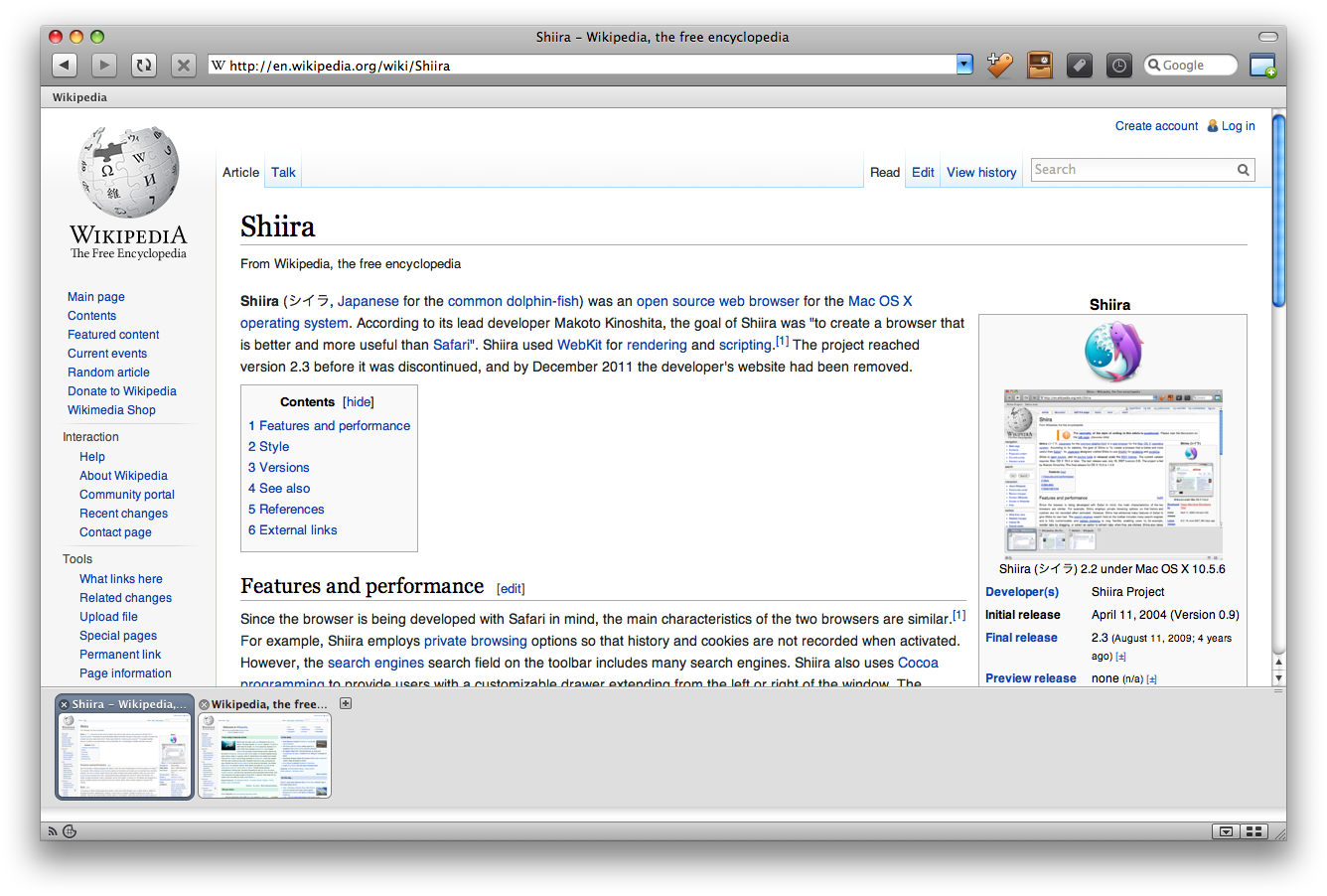
- Shiira (シイラ) 2.3 under Mac OS X 10.5.8
- Developer: Shiira Project
- Initial release: April 11, 2004 (Version 0.9)
- Final release: 2.3 / 11 August 2009; 16 years ago
- Preview release: none (n/a) [±]
- Written in: Objective-C Cocoa
- Engine: WebKit
- Operating system: Mac OS X 10.4 or later
- Available in: Czech, Danish, Dutch, English, Finnish, French, German, Italian, Japanese, Korean, Norwegian, Polish, Portuguese, Slovak, Spanish, Swedish, Simplified Chinese, Traditional Chinese
- Type: Web browser
- License: BSD-3-Clause
- Website: (in Japanese) shiira.jp/blog

Shiira (シイラ, Japanese for the common dolphin-fish) is a discontinued open source web browser for the Mac OS X operating system. According to its lead developer Makoto Kinoshita, the goal of Shiira was "to create a browser that is better and more useful than Safari". Shiira used WebKit for rendering and scripting. The project reached version 2.3 before it was discontinued, and by December 2011 the developer's website had been removed.

== Features and performance ==
Since the browser was developed with Safari in mind, the main characteristics of the two browsers are similar. For example, Shiira employs private browsing options so that history and cookies are not recorded when activated. However, the search engines search field on the toolbar includes many search engines. Shiira also uses Cocoa programming to provide users with a customizable drawer extending from the left or right of the window. The drawer includes bookmarks, history, downloads, and an RSS reader. In version 2.0, the sidebar was replaced by a series of palettes opened and closed from the main window toolbar. Shiira natively supports in-browser PDF viewing.

== Style ==
The features of Shiira included appearance options. Users could switch between Aqua or Metal styles in addition to changing the buttons' appearances. However, in the 2.0 release, changes in themes were not available. Tabs were also customizable. Another option was "Tab Exposé", which acted much like the Exposé feature of Mac OS X; each tab was visible in its totality, enabling users to select the tab to which they wished to navigate. The 1.x releases of Shiira also had a page-turning effect for transitions between any two webpages; however, this was dropped from 2.x releases. The interface in Shiira 2.0 could be set to display tabs as thumbnails along the bottom or sides of the window.

== Versions ==
The latest release (version 2.3) requires Mac OS X 10.4 or later. Shiira 2.3 has not been tested on the latest versions of the OS, and has been reported to be buggy on Mac OS X 10.5 and 10.6. The final release for Mac OS X 10.3 was 1.2.2.

== See also ==
- List of web browsers
- Comparison of web browsers
- Comparison of feed aggregators
