= ICab =

Web browser for MacOS

iCab

- iCab 6.2.1 in dark mode on macOS Sonoma
- Developer: Alexander Clauss
- Release: February 17, 1999; 27 years ago
- Stable release: 6.3.6 / 16 November 2025; 11 months ago
- Operating system: Mac OS, iOS (active), Classic Mac OS 7.5–9.2.2 (discontinued)
- Available in: English, German, French, Danish, Spanish, Russian, Norwegian, Chinese and Japanese
- Type: Web browser Feed reader
- License: Shareware
- Website: icab.de

iCab is a web browser for MacOS and Classic Mac OS by Alexander Clauss, derived from Crystal Atari Browser (CAB) for Atari TOS compatible computers. It was one of the few browsers still updated for the classic Mac OS prior to that version being discontinued after version 3.0.5 in 2008; Classilla was the last browser that was maintained for that OS but it was discontinued in 2021.

The downloadable product is fully functional, but is nagware—periodically displaying a dialog box asking the user to register the product, and upgrade to the "Pro" version.

== Versions ==
iCab 2.9.9 supports both 68k and PowerPC Macintosh systems running System 7.5 through Mac OS 9.2.2. While no longer maintained, iCab 2.9.9 is still available for download and registration.

iCab 2.9.8 runs natively on early versions of Mac OS X, but Mac OS X compatible versions of iCab 2.x are no longer officially available for download.

iCab 3.x can run on PowerPC systems running Mac OS 8.5 through Mac OS 9.2.2, or PowerPC or Intel systems running Mac OS X 10.1 or later. iCab 3 was last updated in January 2008.

iCab 4 was rewritten to use the Cocoa API and the WebKit rendering engine. It can run on PowerPC or Intel systems running Mac OS 10.3.9 or later.

iCab 5 was released on June 12, 2012. It runs on Mac OS 10.5 or later.

iCab 6 was rewritten using the new technologies in macOS Big Sur and released on October 31, 2020. It runs on macOS 10.13 or later.

== History ==
iCab was introduced in 1999. The first versions of iCab were criticized for not supporting CSS and DOM, but were given praise for making it easier to navigate to links listed on pages. iCab 3 introduced improved rendering capabilities, including support for CSS2 and Unicode (via the ATSUI toolkit). iCab 4 switched to WebKit for its rendering engine, giving it the same rendering abilities as Apple's Safari browser.

On 7 June 2009, iCab 4.6, using the WebKit rendering engine, became the first desktop browser released to display a score of 100/100 and pass the Acid3 test. Apple's Safari 4 browser was released one day later and has been officially credited as being the first official release browser to pass the Acid3 test with a score of 100/100.

== Features ==
iCab features a filter manager which allows users to avoid downloading advertisements and other content. Currently iCab comes with two filters (advertisements and video). Other kinds of filters add features, such as the YouTube video filter which adds a download link on all YouTube page views.

iCab has features for website developers, including an HTML validity checker, an automatic page refresh option, a Web Inspector, DOM Inspector, JavaScript debugger, and a Console. iCab's "Automatic Update" option, for any page it is rendering directly from the local hard disk, will automatically reload the page when changes are saved to disk. The HTML syntax validity checker displays a smiley face in the Status Bar and also, optionally, in the Toolbar. Clicking on the smiley will bring up a list of any errors on the page, as will "Error Report" from the Tools menu. Double clicking on an error will display the page source, with the offending syntax highlighted. The HTML syntax validator was first seen in the same author's earlier web browser, CAB.

iCab's Download manager allows the user to start, stop, resume and review downloads. It maintains a download history, and supports downloading of an individual page, or a whole site (crawling) with many user-selectable crawl-constraint options. It can save as portable web archives (a ZIP archive containing HTML, images and other files), or as individual files on the local hard drive.

iCab also contains the following features:

- Tabbed browsing.
- Javascript and CSS2 support.
- Multiple language support, including Arabic on older Macs (cannot display UTF-16 pages).
- Filtering:
  - Filtering out of images and plugin content (e.g. ads).
  - Adjust rendering, network, JavaScript, and cookies settings for individual sites or types of pages.
- Kiosk mode: full-screen display and access controls.
- Acid2 test compliance.
- Configurable print dialog.
- History window which can sort by title, last access date, or URL.
- Hotlist (bookmark) mechanism which can automatically or manually check for updates to bookmarked sites.
- Reload a single image on a page without needing to reload the whole page.
- Disable web "annoyances" such as animated GIFs and embedded sound files.
- User agent spoofing (i.e. pretending to be another browser).
- Support for sessions (i.e. saving and then loading all open windows and tabs).
- Add any query (e.g., search engine, Wikipedia) to the toolbar search widget by point-and-click.

== iCab Mobile ==
iCab Mobile is the mobile version of the iCab Web Browser for iOS and iPadOS. It is one of the oldest third-party web browsers for iOS, being released in 2009. The app is available on the app store for $1.99. iCab Mobile includes custom gestures, quick links for sharing, a drop down window that provides previews of tabs, a customizable user interface, Apple Watch integration, quick form filling, customizable filters for CSS pages, URLs, and cookies. It also has a file downloader and manager and integration with the Files app. Some reviewers have criticized it for its cluttered user interface.

== See also ==
- List of web browsers
- Comparison of web browsers
