= AOL Explorer =

Web browser

- Developer: AOL LLC
- Initial release: July 2005
- Final release: 1.5 / May 2006
- Preview release: none (n/a) [±]
- Operating system: Microsoft Windows
- Successor: AOL Desktop
- Type: Web browser
- License: Freeware
- Website: downloads.channel.aol.com/browser

AOL Explorer, previously known as AOL Browser, was a graphical web browser developed by AOL. It was released in July 2005 as a free, standalone download, or as an optional software bundled while installing AOL Instant Messenger. AOL Explorer supported tabbed browsing and used Microsoft's Trident browser engine. The browser was briefly succeeded by AOL OpenRide in 2006, followed by AOL Desktop in 2007.

== History ==
In 2003, AOL was given rights to Microsoft's Internet Explorer browser in a seven-year contract. As such, AOL Explorer shared similarities with Microsoft's flagship browser, notably the ability to access Windows updates, and install Internet Explorer-compatible plugins. Security features such as a pop-up blocker and spyware detection were built into the browser.

Version 1.5 was launched in May 2006, adding Desktop Widgets, Visual Themes, a Feeds Screensaver and various performance improvements. Desktop Widgets allowed the user to "tear off" a side panel and use it independently from the browser. RSS Feeds could be shown in a screensaver, and Show Page Preview allowed users to see previews of web page links without leaving the page.

== Reception ==
AOL Explorer was praised by PC Magazine for its wealth of features and its visual design. Some criticisms were that the browser had "questionable anti-spyware tools", and that it did not support third-party toolbars.

== See also ==
- List of web browsers
- Comparison of web browsers
- List of feed aggregators
- Comparison of feed aggregators
