= Dooble =

Web browser

Dooble Web Browser

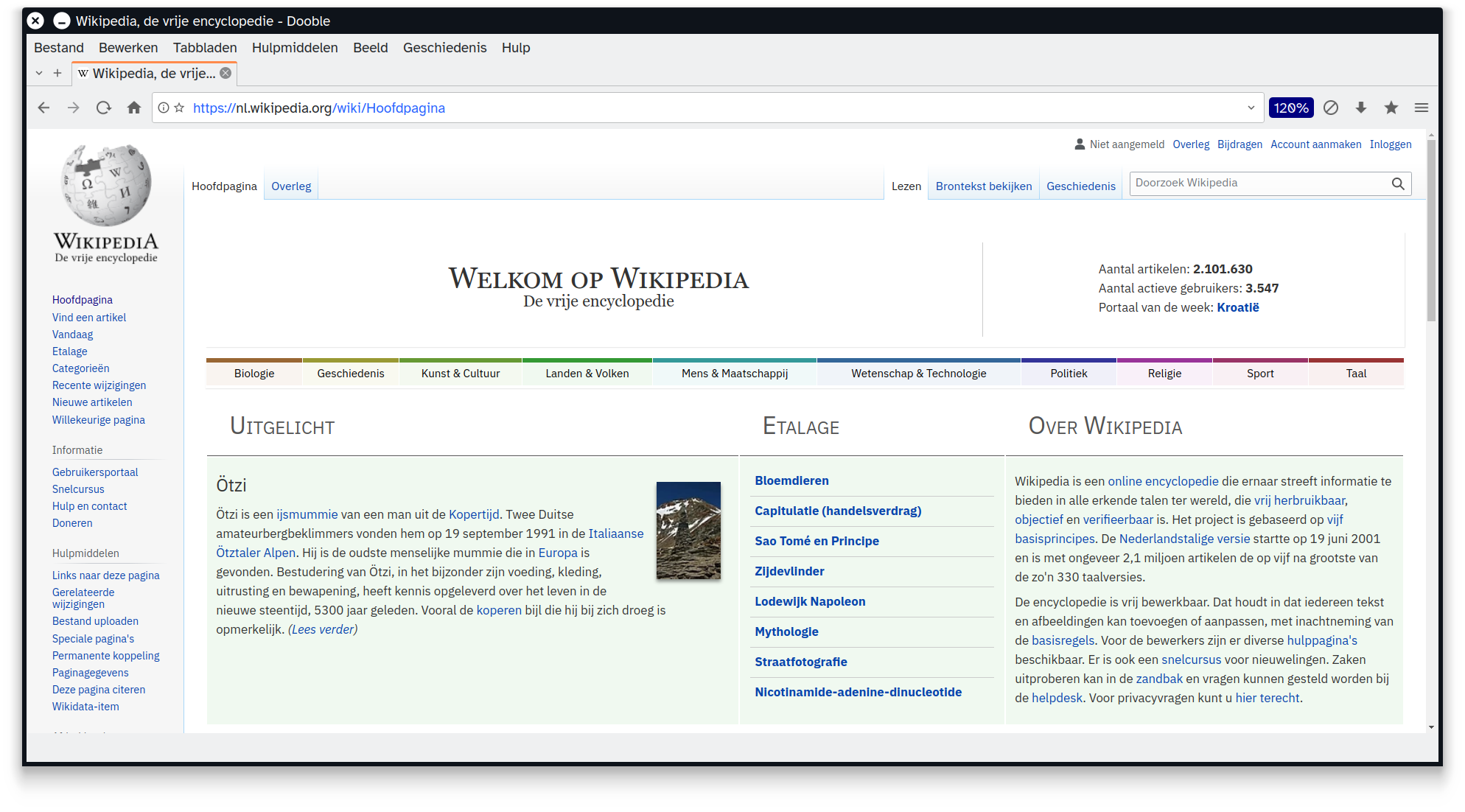
- Screenshot of Dooble Web Browser 2022.06.15, showing the front page of Dutch Wikipedia
- Developer: Dooble Project Team
- Initial release: August 2008; 17 years ago
- Stable release: 2025.04.07 / 7 April 2025; 13 months ago
- Preview release: None [±]
- Written in: C++
- Engine: Qt WebEngine
- Operating system: FreeBSD, Linux, macOS, OS/2, Windows
- Platform: Cross-platform
- Size: 80.3 MB
- Available in: Multilanguage
- Type: Web Browser
- License: BSD-3-Clause
- Website: textbrowser.github.io/dooble/
- Repository: github.com/textbrowser/dooble

Dooble is a free and open-source web browser that was created to offer improved privacy for users. Currently, Dooble is available for FreeBSD, Haiku, Linux, macOS, OS/2, and Windows. Dooble uses Qt for its user interface and abstraction from the operating system and processor architecture. As a result, Dooble should be portable to any system that supports OpenSSL, POSIX threads, Qt, SQLite, and other libraries.

== Features ==
Dooble is designed and implemented in order to improve privacy and usability.

- Dooble includes a simple bookmarking system. Users may modify bookmarks via a bookmarks browser and a popup that's accessible from the location widget.
- Along with standard cookie management options, Dooble also provides a mechanism that automatically removes cookies. If permitted, Dooble will occasionally remove undesired HTTP cookies.
- Dooble Web Browser provides according to the News Portal Hongkiat an "easy to use download manager".
- Most of the data that Dooble retains is stored using authenticated encryption. Dooble does not encode file associations and user settings. Dooble also provides a session-based model using temporary keys. The passphrase may be modified without the loss of data.
- Included is a non-JavaScript file manager and FTP browser.
- Version 1.53 introduced Gopher (protocol) support.
- A security passphrase can be created for the browser. The password can be set from the Safe area of the browser settings. "You need to create a master password, otherwise everything is wiped when you exit the program", points out PCAdvisor.
- Version 1.26 of Dooble introduced support for add-ons. The Tor Browser Add-On based on Vidalia was added in version 1.40. The Vidalia plugin was removed in version 1.49.
- The Add-On with the name InterFace expands the browser with social network functions like a messenger with group chat, a friend list, an e-mail client, a chess game, and a forum function like a bulletin board.
- InterFace is based on Qt and can be integrated as a plugin. It's based on a clone of the RetroShare Messenger. The plugin is considered deprecated.
- Configurable proxy settings provide reasonable flexibility.
- Dooble supports session restoration for authenticated sessions. If Dooble exits prematurely, the user may restore previous tabs and windows at the next authenticated session.
- Some Web sites employ iFrames in order to distribute content from one or more third-party Web sites. Since this technology may raise privacy issues with some users, Dooble provides a means of blocking external content.

== History ==
The first version (0.1) was released in September 2008.

Since November 5, 2017 it uses the Qt WebEngine.

The version (2.1.6) was released on January 25, 2018.

== Releases ==
Dooble was also available on Nokia's N900.

== Reception ==
In 2014 Dooble was rated as the ninth of ten "top" Linux browsers by Jack Wallen. Dooble further has been announced in 2015 as one of the top five best secure browsers. PCWorld reviewed Dooble in 2015 on the feature side as "rendering quickly, even on image-heavy sites". The Guardian recommended Dooble in 2015 as an alternative browser against surveillance: "Try out a privacy-focused browser such as Dooble.".

== See also ==
- List of web browsers
- List of web browsers for Unix and Unix-like operating systems
- Comparison of web browsers
- Qt (software)
- Timeline of web browsers
- Web browser history
