= SalamWeb =

Muslim compliant web browser developed by Salam Web Technologies DMCC

- SalamWeb browser on Windows 10
- Developer: Salam Web Technologies DMCC
- Initial release: 17 January 2019

Stable release(s)
- Android: 4.6.0.48 / 29 September 2020
- iOS: 4.6.3 / 29 September 2020
- macOS: 4.6.3.589 / 24 September 2020
- Windows: 4.5 / 31 July 2020
- Written in: C++, Assembly, Python, JavaScript, Java
- Engine: Blink, V8
- Operating system: Android 4.4 and later; iOS 11 or later; macOS 10.10 or later; Windows 7 or later
- Available in: English, (Malaysian and Indonesian), Urdu, Bengali, Arabic, Russian and Turkish.
- Type: Web browser, mobile browser
- License: Freeware
- Website: salamweb.com (archive)

SalamWeb (from Arabic salām, سلام, meaning “peace”) is a discontinued Chromium-based browser developed by the now-defunct Malaysian startup Salam Web Technologies MY Sdn. Designed to deliver a Muslim-friendly Web experience, and targeted towards the Muslim audience, it observed the Islamic law and tradition and was certified as an Islamically compliant web browser.

The browser was also the main component of the Muslim-specific digital ecosystem, which included web apps and SalamToday, an online magazine with localized and international editions.

SalamWeb was available for Windows, macOS, Android and iOS. It supports multiple languages, including English, Malaysian and Indonesian, Urdu, Arabic, Russian, Turkish, and Bengali.

It was discontinued in 2021 for unknown reasons, and the salamweb.com domain is no longer accessible.

== Features ==
=== Main features ===
In order to create a Muslim-friendly ecosystem, SalamWeb used SalamWebProtect, a three-layered system that filtered out haram – content, products and services which are offensive to Muslims and considered by them to be harmful to children. The system included built-in filters, AI image recognition software and a community-based vetting system where users flagged inappropriate content.

Sadaqah means an act of kindness without expecting anything in return 'fi sabillilah' (for the cause of Allah). SalamSadaqah sought to engage Muslims in charitable activities and to remind them that the idea of charity is central to Islam. SalamWebSadaqah was also SalamWeb's own commitment to make a donation to a charitable project (in association with Global Sadaqah, a global Islamic charity), each time, someone used SalamWeb. SalamWebWidgets helped Muslims practice Islam while staying in touch with technology and the Internet. These include Prayer Times, which shows the upcoming praying time, Praying Direction Compass, which showed Qibla (the direction a Muslim must face when praying), Daily Quotes, Mosques Near Me, and others.

SalamWeb was based on Chromium and retained its functionality. It could use browser extensions developed for Google Chrome.

=== Social Browsing ===
From release 4.4, SalamWeb contains the elements of social browsing. SalamWebTalks, a commenting and rating widget, was embedded in the browser. As such, the company claimed it allowed commenting on any web page as long as it contains a URL.

=== Languages ===
The browser was available in English, Malaysian, Indonesian, Urdu, Bengali, Arabic, Russian, and Turkish.

=== SalamWebToday ===
SalamWebToday was an online magazine that sought to engage Muslims into a conversation about what it meant to be a Muslim in a world dominated by technology. By July 2020 SalamWebToday was available in Arabic, Bengali, English, French, Indonesian, Bahasa Melayu, Russian, and Turkish.

== Concept and cultural impact ==
The Muslim world remains divided over the internet. For some, it is a questionable technology that has been used by child pornographers, money launderers and fraudsters. For others, it is merely an extension of reality and, therefore, ethically neutral.

SalamWeb sided with those Muslim intellectuals who argue that the internet should be seen as an instrument of ‘re-actualisation’ of Islam, that is the reinterpretation of Islamic doctrines in such a way that they become more relevant to the modern time. If understood correctly, they say, the internet can produce a kind of Muslim Renaissance similar in effect to the flowering of Islamic science, culture and the community life during the Abbasid period. To achieve this, SalamWeb sought to promote the Islamic concept of ijma’, that is building knowledge and understanding through enlightened debate.

== Reception ==
SalamWeb received positive reviews from users and critics. A Bloomberg News report in 2019 called SalamWeb a sign of demand for a browser that is compliant with Islamic values, at a time of mounting concerns about privacy, bias, and online abuse. Also in 2019, Financial Management magazine reported that SalamWeb gained popularity as an alternative for Muslims preferring content aligned with Islamic values. Reviews for websites directed at Asian users found that SalamWeb was mostly effective at blocking haram content, that is, content that is prohibited or offensive to Muslims.

SalamWeb was the first web browser to be certified by the private Amanie Shariah Supervisory Board. It was endorsed by Malaysian Digital Economy Corporation as compliant with the Islamic Digital Economy Guide (Mi'yar).
