= Midori (web browser) =

Free and open-source web browser

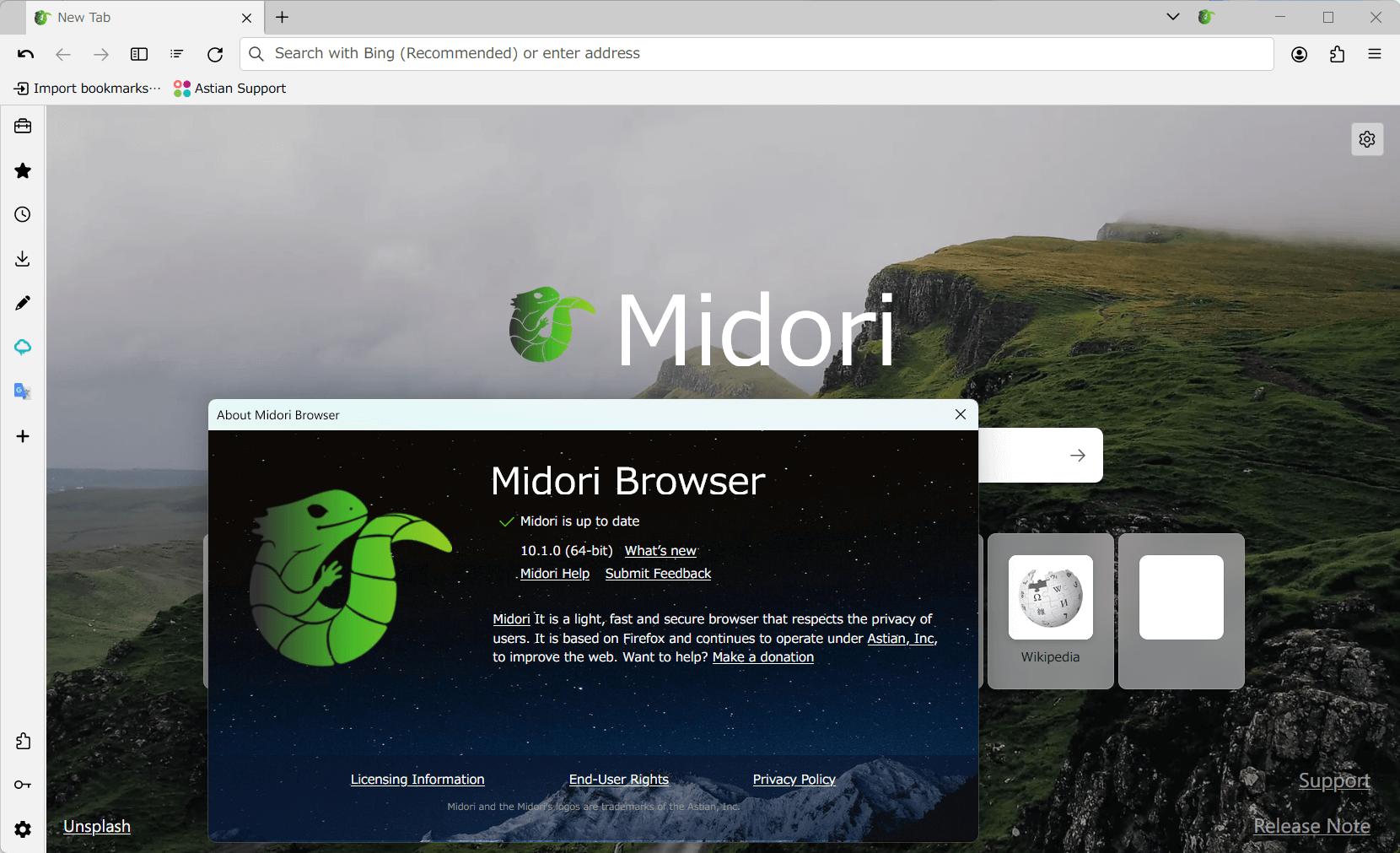
- Midori v11.0 (November 2023)
- Developers: Christian Dywan, Nancy Runge, Astian Foundation
- Release: 16 December 2007

Stable release(s)
- Android: 3.5.15 / 14 July 2025

Preview release(s) [±]
- 9.0 (July 29, 2019; 7 years ago) [±]
- Written in: originally in C & GTK2, rewritten completely in Vala & GTK3
- Engine: Gecko
- Operating system: Linux, Android, Windows, macOS
- Platform: IA-32, AMD64, x86
- Available in: 30 languages
- Type: Web browser
- License: LGPL-2.1-or-later
- Website: astian.org/en/midori-browser/
- Repository: github.com/goastian/midori-desktop github.com/midori-browser/core

Midori (Japanese: 緑, lit. 'green') is a free and open-source web browser. In 2019, the Midori project was acquired by the Astian Foundation. After the acquisition, the project became a derivative of the Firefox browser.

== History ==
Midori began as a lightweight web browser using the WebKitGTK rendering engine and the GTK widget toolkit. Midori was part of the Xfce desktop environment's Goodies collection of applications and followed the Xfce principle of "making the most out of available resources". It was the default browser in the SliTaz Linux distribution, Trisquel Mini, Artix Linux, old versions of Raspbian, and wattOS in its "R5 release". It was the default browser in elementary OS "Freya" and "Luna", and Bodhi Linux. Midori was part of the standard Raspbian distribution for the Raspberry Pi ARMv6-based computer, while Dillo and NetSurf are also in the menu.

Midori passed the standard compliance Acid3 test. In March 2014, Midori scored 405/555 on the HTML5 test. In July 2015, Midori 0.5 on Windows 8 scored 325/555 on the updated HTML5 test.

In June 2024, Astian's CEO announced Midori would launch their own open source VPN service. The VPN service became available in February 2025, though not yet integrated within the browser.

In March 2025, Astian released version 11.5.2, the first version to support macOS. It also announced plans for making Midori available on iPhone and iPad.

== Features ==
Midori featured:

- Support for integration with GTK2 and GTK3
- WebKitGTK rendering engine
- Tabs, windows and session management
- Configurable web search engine
- User scripts and user styles support
- Bookmark management
- Customizable and extensible interface
- Extension modules can be written in C and Vala
- Support for HTML5
- DuckDuckGo as a default search engine
- Internationalized domain names support
- Smart bookmarks
- Extensions
  - Adblock Plus
  - Form history
  - Mouse gestures
  - Cookie management
  - RSS Feed panel
- Maemo integration for mobile devices
- Speed dial
- 'Next Page' feature
- Support for Ubuntu Unity
- Private browsing
- Tab backup for the next session by default

== Reception ==
The former Midori was recommended by Lifehacker due to its simplicity. The major points for criticism are the absence of process isolation, the low number of available extensions and occasional crashes.

Nick Veitch from TechRadar included Midori 0.2.2 in his 2010 list of the eight best web browsers for Linux. At that time he rated it as "5/10" and concluded, "while it does perform reasonably well all-round, there is no compelling reason to choose this browser over the default Gnome browser, Epiphany, or indeed any of the bigger boys".

Himanshu Arora of Computerworld reviewed Midori 0.5.4 in November 2013 and praised the browser's speed and uncluttered interface, while additionally underlining the private browsing mode which uses a separate launch icon and displays the mode's differences on the home tab.

Victor Clarke from Gigaom praised the former Midori's minimalism in 2014 stating: "Midori will satisfy your humble needs without slowing down your PC.", despite stressing the lack of advanced functionality.

== See also ==
- GNOME Web – a similar web browser based on GTK and WebKitGTK
- List of web browsers for Unix and Unix-like operating systems
