= Torch (web browser) =

Proprietary, adware supported web browser

- Developer: Torch Media Inc.
- Initial release: June 18, 2012
- Final release: 69.2.0.1713 / 30 September 2020; 5 years ago
- Operating system: Windows 7, Windows 8 and Windows 10
- Platform: IA-32
- Size: 82.3 MB
- Available in: English, French, Spanish, Turkish, Italian, Portuguese, German
- Type: Web browser, BitTorrent client
- License: Freeware, adware
- Website: torchbrowser.com

Torch was a Chromium-based web browser and Internet suite developed by the North Carolina–based Torch Media. As of November 2022, downloads for Torch are no longer available, and upon clicking the download button, users are redirected to the (now defunct) Torch Search extension on the Chrome Web Store.

The browser handles common Internet-related tasks such as displaying websites, sharing websites via social networks, downloading torrents, accelerating downloads and grabbing online media, all directly from the browser. Torch Browser is commercial freeware.

Torch is based on the Chromium source code and is compatible with all add-ons and extensions available in the Chrome store. On June 18, 2013, Torch announced that it had surpassed ten million active users.

Torrent site The Pirate Bay has run paid endorsements for Torch on their website.

== Features ==
The built-in BitTorrent client allows users to download torrent files. Users can directly share sites, videos, audio and search results with their Facebook and Twitter accounts.

On June 18, 2013, Torch announced a major release for Mac and Windows that included an integrated download accelerator. The same release also introduced Torch Music, a free social music discovery service that organizes music videos available on YouTube in a user-friendly interface. Users can easily find and stream music videos, create playlists, and follow their Facebook friends’ musical choices. Torch Music is integrated directly into Torch Browser, which includes an embedded controller to control music from any browser tab.

On July 1, 2013, Torch version 25.0.0.3712 was released. The release included the ability to download Instagram and Vine videos in a single click. Torch's ability to download Instagram videos was featured on CNET's Tekzilla Daily.

On February 26, 2014, Torch version 29.0.0.6508 was released. The release included the ability to customize the look and feel of users' Facebook pages using pre-set themes. Users can customize these themes or create their own. A user's customized page is visible to him/herself and to anyone visiting the original user's page from another Torch browser if the original user allows it.

On May 20, 2014, Torch version 33.0.0.6975 was released. The release updated the Chromium engine used by Torch and introduced an embedded player to stream torrents downloaded before the download is completed.

== Reception ==
Reviews of Torch have evolved over time, as the browser continued to add features and functionality. Early versions of the browser have received mixed reviews, with some praising its interesting feature combination while others pointed to the lack of add-on support (an issue which has been resolved in newer versions).

In October 2012, The Blog Herald said of Torch: "The Torch Web Browser is built on a lightweight framework that offers what appears to be decent security. If you like to browse the web while grabbing various files this might be the perfect browser for your arsenal of web applications. Overall I have been pleased with the Torch Browser and I only hope it continues to grow so more social sharing features can be experienced and more files can be grabbed."

In reviewing Torch in December 2012, CNET said of Torch 2.0.0.1614: "An all-in-one Web browser is nothing to sneeze at, but Torch Browser isn't going to pry you away from Chrome or Firefox. While it has options that make sharing and social media a breeze, Torch Browser just isn't unique enough to win people's hearts. It lags in performance and its major features aren't worth making the switch...Torch Browser tries to carve out its niche by being an all-in-one Web browser... However, it doesn't do any of those things well enough to replace what you currently use. Once you get over the novelty, it becomes obvious that Torch Browser isn't that powerful as a Web portal. It's noticeably slower than other browsers and it doesn't have the same sort of add-on support. The layout is just a rip-off of the open-canvas setup of other, more popular browsers. None of this is to say that using it is all a bad experience. Torch Browser still runs circles around Internet Explorer and would be a major upgrade there... While not a threat to Firefox or Chrome, Torch Browser is easy enough to use and might just impress Internet Explorer users. Heavy downloaders might enjoy the torrent downloader and media player that come with it, too."

PC Advisor, in an April 2013 review of the newest version, gave Torch 3.5/5 stars and praised it: "This is a great alternative browser that adds some interesting extras on top of the Chrome engine. It’s well worth trying out".

In a March 2015 TechRadar review by Jamie Hinks, the publication called Torch 39 "an excellent alternative for anyone looking to a browser that breaks away from the norm".

== Criticism ==
=== Bundling of unwanted software ===
Torch Media receives payments from companies like Ask.com to bundle potentially unwanted programs with the browser. Users may be asked to install search toolbars or adware programs during installation. These bundled programs commonly do one or more of the following things:

- Change the user's browser homepage to a page with ads
- Change the user's default search engine
- Prevent the user from changing their homepage and default search engine
- Collect and upload data about the user's internet browsing behavior
- Add toolbars to the user's browsers
- Inject advertisements into websites that are visited by the user

While this practice is deemed controversial by some, users are given a chance to opt out of sponsored software and Torch claims to work fine without it.

Torch makes contradictory claims about the software they bundle. Their online troubleshooter claims that "Torch does not install additional toolbars" while at the same time stating that "the Torch installer may include an optional Ask.com toolbar" on another page.
