= Ladybird (web browser) =

Open-source web browser

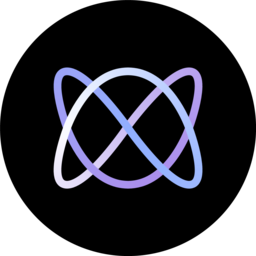

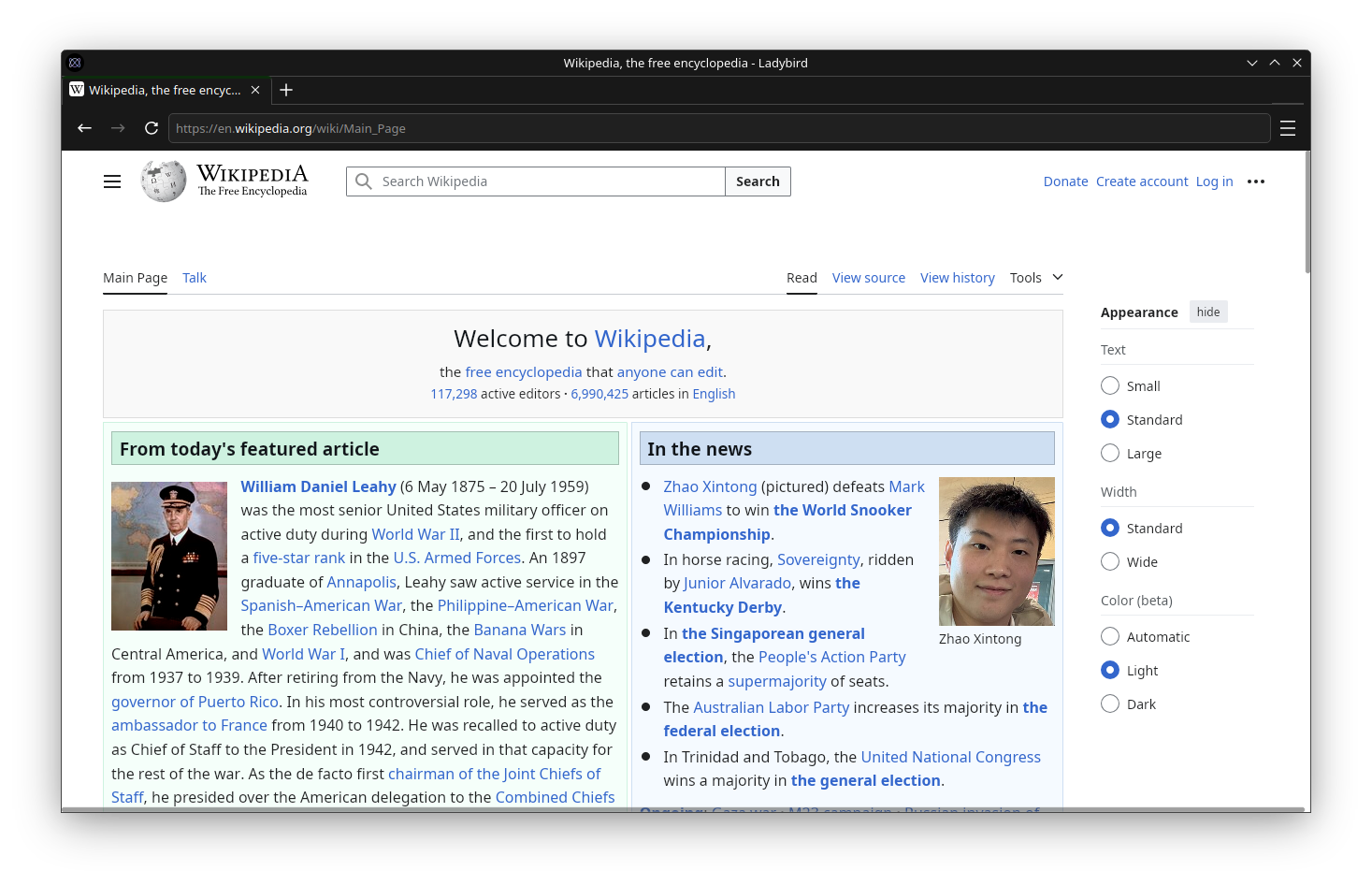
- Ladybird, showing the main page of Wikipedia
- Original author: Andreas Kling
- Developer: Ladybird Browser Initiative
- Written in: C++, Rust
- Operating system: macOS; Linux; BSD; Unix-like
- Type: Web browser
- License: BSD 2-Clause License
- Website: ladybird.org
- Repository: github.com/LadybirdBrowser/ladybird

Ladybird is an open-source web browser licensed under the BSD 2-Clause License. It is developed by the Ladybird Browser Initiative, a nonprofit organization focused solely on development of the browser. The initiative is funded entirely through donations, with Cloudflare, FUTO, Shopify, Proton and 37signals among its sponsors.

Originally created as a component of SerenityOS in 2019, it has been developed as a standalone project since 2022. An alpha release is planned in 2026, beta release is expected in 2027, and a stable release for general public in 2028.

Ladybird uses a browser engine that is not based on any existing browser engine (e.g. Google's Chromium, Mozilla's Gecko, or Apple's WebKit). Ladybird uses its own rendering engine and JavaScript interpreter with WebAssembly support. The project also uses third-party open source libraries (unlike its predecessor in SerenityOS).

== History ==
The project was initially developed by the SerenityOS community using its internal software libraries (e.g. LibWeb). Ladybird was spun off into a separate project in September 2022 by Andreas Kling, the founder and a former maintainer of the SerenityOS project.

In June 2024 Kling announced that he would be stepping back from the SerenityOS project to focus solely on building the Ladybird browser. In July 2024 the Ladybird Browser Initiative announced that it was being funded by Chris Wanstrath, the co-founder of GitHub. Wanstrath donated $1 million. Ladybird began receiving sponsorships to fund its development including from large companies such as Shopify and Proton VPN. Kling named Shopify as the first corporate sponsor with $100,000 in 2023.

According to XDA, as of March 2025, it ranked fourth-highest on the Web Platform Tests, a suite of tests used by browser developers, below Chrome, Safari and Firefox. It also had the second most conformant JavaScript engine after Firefox's SpiderMonkey.

In February 2026, Ladybird started porting the JavaScript parser and bytecode generator from C++ to Rust. Kling used Claude Code and Codex artificial intelligence tools. The port covered about 25,000 lines of Rust. By July 2026 Rust code had expanded beyond the JavaScript engine.

On 5 June 2026, the project announced it would no longer accept public pull requests nor allow any other channels for submitting patches from non-maintainers, citing concerns about lower-quality contributions and the need for better security as the browser gets closer to its first alpha release. The code will still be available under an open-source license.

Content blocking with downloadable filter lists is supported. Linux and macOS are the development targets for the planned 2026 alpha and 2027 beta releases. A native Windows port is not a priority and may be considered later. Windows developers can use WSL2 in the meantime. The desktop interface uses Qt.
