= List of web browsers for Unix and Unix-like operating systems =

The following is a list of web browsers for various Unix and Unix-like operating systems. Not all of these browsers are specific to these operating systems; some are available on non-Unix systems as well. Some, but not most, have a mobile version.

== Graphical ==
Colored items in this table are discontinued.

Web browser	Layout engine	UI toolkit	Source model	Status	Notes
Abaco	Custom	Custom (Acme-like)	Open-source	Discontinued	For Plan 9
Amaya	Custom	wxWidgets	Open-source	Discontinued	Also a web page composer tool (HTML editor)
Angelfish	Blink	Qt	Open-source		Adaptive browser for KDE and Plasma Mobile using QtWebEngine.
Arena	Custom	Xlib	Open-source	Discontinued	Discontinued testbed for W3C
Arora	WebKit	Qt	Open-source	Discontinued	
Basilisk	Goanna	XUL	Open-source		Basilisk is a fork of Firefox with substantial divergence, especially for add-ons.
Beonex Communicator	Gecko	GTK+	Open-source	Discontinued	A separate branch of the Mozilla Application Suite
Brave	Blink	GTK	Open-source		Mozilla Public License, version 2
Camino	Gecko	Cocoa	Open-source	Discontinued	Formerly called Chimera; Requires Mac OS X
Conkeror	Gecko	XUL	Open-source	Discontinued	
Chromium	Blink	GTK	Open-source		Close affinity with Google Chrome
Dillo	Dillo	FLTK	Open-source		Versions prior to 2.0 were built upon GTK+.
Dooble	Qt WebEngine	Qt	Open-source		BSD License
Fifth	WebKit	FLTK	Open-source		Aimed at replicating the pre-v15 Opera user experience.
Flock	Gecko	XUL	Open-source	Discontinued	Specialised version of Mozilla Firefox
Galeon	Gecko	GTK+	Open-source	Discontinued	
GNU IceCat	Gecko	XUL	Open-source		Rebranded Mozilla Firefox, renamed from Iceweasel
Google Chrome	Blink	GTK	Closed source		Based on Chromium - Freeware under Google Chrome Terms of Service
iCab	WebKit	Cocoa	Closed source		Versions prior to 4 used custom layout engine
Iceape	Gecko	XUL	Open-source	Discontinued	Rebranded as SeaMonkey
Internet Explorer for Mac	Tasman	Carbon	Closed source	Discontinued	Using Tasman in version 5
Internet Explorer for UNIX	Trident	Motif	Closed source	Discontinued	
Kazehakase	Gecko	GTK+	Open-source	Discontinued	Dormant since 2012
Kirix Strata	Gecko	wxWidgets	Open-source		
Konqueror	KHTML, WebKit	Qt	Open-source		Default web browser for KDE
LibreWolf	Gecko	XUL	Open-source		Soft-fork of Mozilla Firefox with a focus on privacy and security
Midori	Gecko	GTK	Open-source		Default browser for Xfce
Mosaic	Custom	Motif	Closed source	Discontinued	One of the first web browsers
Mozilla Application Suite	Gecko	XUL	Open-source	Discontinued	
Mozilla Firefox	Gecko	XUL	Open-source		
NetSurf	NetSurf	GTK, Framebuffer	Open-source		NetSurf is not tied to any particular UI toolkits. Currently GTK and framebuffer front end implementations exist. For RISC OS, Amiga and others.
OmniWeb	WebKit	Cocoa	Closed source		Using WebKit since version 5.5
Opera	Blink	Xlib	Closed source		Opera used its own layout engine, Presto, through version 12.XX. Linux versions were suspended when Opera moved to Blink and resumed with version 26.
Otter Browser	WebKit/Blink (engine)	Qt	Open-source		Aimed at replicating the pre-v15 Opera user experience.
Pale Moon	Goanna	XUL	Open-source		Pale Moon is a fork of Firefox with substantial divergence, especially for add-ons and user interface.
Falkon (QupZilla)	Qt WebEngine	Qt	Open-source		
Rekonq	WebKit	Qt	Open-source	Discontinued	
Roccat Browser	WebKit	Cocoa	Closed source		
Safari	WebKit	Cocoa	Closed source		
SeaMonkey	Gecko	XUL	Open-source		Community-developed version of now abandoned Mozilla Application Suite codebase
Shiira	WebKit	Cocoa	Open-source	Discontinued	For Mac OS X only
SRWare Iron	Blink	GTK	Closed-source		Based on Chromium, removes information transfer to third parties such as Google by default. Has had its source code available at various points in development but currently has a proprietary codebase
Surf	WebKitGTK	keyboard-driven	Open-source		Minimalist web browser.
Swiftfox	Gecko	XUL	Closed source	Discontinued	Proprietary optimised build of Mozilla Firefox
Swiftweasel	Gecko	XUL	Open-source	Discontinued	Optimised build of Mozilla Firefox
TenFourFox	Gecko	XUL	Open-source	Discontinued	PowerPC build of Firefox for Mac OS X
tkWWW	Custom	Tcl	Open-source	Discontinued	
Uzbl	WebKit	GTK+	Open-source	Discontinued	Follows the Unix philosophy
GNOME Web	WebKit	GTK	Open-source		Formerly called Epiphany; Versions prior to 2.27.0 were built upon Gecko
Waterfox	Gecko	XUL	Open-source		Firefox fork
xombrero	WebKit	GTK+	Open-source	Discontinued	Renamed from xxxterm; originated from OpenBSD community
Web browser	Layout engine	UI toolkit	Source model	Status	Notes

== Text-based ==
- ELinks
- Line-mode browser
- Links
- Lynx
- w3m

== See also ==
- List of web browsers
- Comparison of web browsers
- Comparison of lightweight web browsers
