= Comparison of lightweight web browsers =

A lightweight web browser is a web browser that sacrifices some of the features of a mainstream web browser in order to reduce the consumption of system resources, and especially to minimize the memory footprint.

The tables below compare notable lightweight web browsers. Several of them use a common layout engine, but each has a unique combination of features and a potential niche. The minimal user interface in surf, for example, does not have tabs, whereas xombrero can be driven with vi-like keyboard commands.

Four of the browsers compared—Lynx, w3m, Links, and ELinks—are designed for text mode, and can function in a terminal emulator. Eww is limited to working within Emacs. Links 2 has both a text-based user interface and a graphical user interface. w3m is, in addition to being a web browser, also a terminal pager.

== Overview ==
Browser	Developers	Status	Engine	Programming languages	License	Latest release	
Browser	Developers	Status	Engine	Programming languages	License	Version	Date
Arora	Benjamin C. Meyer et al.	Discontinued	QtWebKit	C++	GPL-2.0-or-later	0.11.0	2010-09-27
Dillo	Jorge Arellano Cid et al.	Active	Dillo	C, C++	GPL-3.0-or-later	3.3.0	2026-04-26
ELinks	Petr Baudiš, Jonas Fonseca, et al.	Active	Links	C, C++	GPL-2.0-only	0.20.0	2026-07-26
Eww	Lars Magne Ingebrigtsen	Active	GNU Emacs libraries	Emacs Lisp	GPL-3.0-or-later		
Falkon (QupZilla)	David Rosca	Active	QtWebKit / Qt WebEngine	C++	GPL-3.0-or-later	26.04.3	2026-06-28
hv3	Dan Kennedy & team	Discontinued	Tkhtml	Tcl	GPL		
K-Meleon	Christophe Thibault et al.	Active	Gecko / Goanna (fork)	C++	GPL	76.4.7	2023-04-07
Links	Mikuláš Patočka, Twibright Labs, et al.	Active	Links	C	GPL-2.0-or-later	2.30	2024-07-27
Lynx	Lou Montulli, Thomas Dickey, et al.	Active	libwww derivative	C (ISO C)	GPL-2.0-only	2.9.3	2026-05-27
NetSurf	John-Mark Bell, Michael Drake, et al.	Active	NetSurf	C (ANSI C)	GPL-2.0-only	3.11	2023-12-28
Otter Browser	Michał Dutkiewicz	Active	QtWebKit / Qt WebEngine	C++	GPL-3.0-or-later	1.0.03	2022-02-22
QtWeb	LogicWare; LSoft Technologies	Unmaintained	QtWebKit	C++	GPL-2.0-or-later	3.8.5	2013-09-09
qutebrowser	Freya Bruhin et al.	Active	QtWebKit / Qt WebEngine	Python3	GPL-3.0-or-later	3.7.0	2026-04-03
rekonq	Andrea Diamantini et al.	Discontinued	QtWebKit	C++	GPLv3	2.4.2	2014-01-12
surf	Christoph Lohmann et al.	Active	WebKitGTK	C	MIT	2.1	2021-05-08
uzbl	Dieter Plaetinck et al.	Discontinued	WebKitGTK	C, Python	GPL-3.0-only	0.9.1	2016-10-27
w3m	Akinori Ito et al.	Unmaintained	w3m	C	MIT	0.5.6	2026-01-23
WebPositive	Andrea Anzani, Ryan Leavengood, et al.	Active	HaikuWebkit	C++	MIT	1.3-alpha	2021-08-01
xombrero	Marco Peerboom et al.	Discontinued	WebKitGTK	C, JavaScript	ISC	1.6.4	2015-02-17

== Operating system support ==
Browser	BSD	Haiku	Linux	macOS	OpenIndiana	OS/2	QNX	RISC OS	Windows
Arora	Yes	Yes	Yes	Yes	Yes	Yes	No	No	Yes
Dillo	Yes	Yes	Yes	Yes	Yes	No	No	Yes	Cygwin
ELinks	Yes	?	Yes	Yes	Yes	Yes	No	Dropped	?
Falkon (QupZilla)	Dropped	Yes	Yes	Dropped	No	Dropped	No	No	Dropped
K-Meleon	Wine	No	Wine	Wine	No	No	No	No	Yes
Links	Unofficial	No	Yes	Unofficial	?	Yes	No	No	Yes
Lynx	Yes	Yes	Yes	Yes	Yes	Yes	Yes	Yes	Yes
NetSurf	Yes	Yes	Yes	Yes	Yes	No	?	Yes	Yes
Otter Browser	Yes	Unofficial	Yes	Yes	No	No	No	No	Yes
QtWeb	Yes	Unofficial	Yes	Yes	Unofficial (Note: Must be built from source code; requires a compatible version of Qt.)	No	No	No	Yes
qutebrowser	Yes	?	Yes	Yes	?	?	?	?	Yes
rekonq	Yes	No	Yes	No	Unofficial	No	No	No	Inactive (Note: rekonq v1.1 for Windows was published in September 2012. As of June 2014, it is the only published version for Windows.)
surf	Yes	No	Yes	?	?	?	?	No	No
uzbl	?	?	Yes	Yes	?	?	?	?	?
w3m	Unofficial	Unofficial	Yes	Unofficial	Unofficial	Inactive	No	No	Cygwin
WebPositive	No	Yes	No	No	No	No	No	No	No
xombrero	Yes	No	Yes	Yes	Yes	No	No	No	Yes

== Features ==
Test scores reflect the version of the browser engine in use. Generally, a lower score indicates an older version of the browser engine.

	Image formats		Advanced		Test scores		Plug-in APIs	
Browser	GIF, JPEG, PNG	WebP	JavaScript	Frames	Acid3	HTML5test	Netscape	Pepper
Arora	Yes	No	Yes	Yes	100/100 (Note: Some tests take too much time to complete.)	359/550	No (Note: NPAPI is ported to QtWebKit, but is not implemented in this browser.)	No
Dillo	Yes	Yes	No	Partial	N/A (Note: The test requires JavaScript, which is not sufficiently supported by this browser.)	N/A	No	No
ELinks	No	No	Partial (Note: ELinks implements Mozilla's SpiderMonkey JavaScript engine.)	Partial	N/A	N/A	No	No
Falkon (QupZilla)	Yes	Yes	Yes	Yes	100/100	497/550	Partial	Partial
K-Meleon	Yes	No	Yes	Yes	100/100	416/555	Partial	No
Links	Yes (Note: Only Links 2 supports graphics.)	Yes	No (Note: JavaScript support was removed in 2007 (in release 2.1pre29).)	Partial	N/A	N/A	No	No
Lynx	No	No	No	Partial	N/A	N/A	No	No
NetSurf	Yes	Yes	Partial	Yes	N/A	N/A	No	No
Otter Browser	Yes	Yes	Yes	Yes	100/100	370/550	Yes	No
QtWeb	Yes	No	Yes	Yes	100/100 (Note: The final state does not match the reference rendering.)	234/550	No	No
qutebrowser	Yes	Yes	Yes	Yes	99/100	521/550	No	No
rekonq	Yes	No	Yes	Yes	100/100	385/555	No	Partial
surf	Yes	Yes (Note: WebP is supported via the WebKitGTK browser engine.)	Yes	Yes	100/100	385/500	Yes	?
uzbl	Yes	Yes	Yes	Yes	98/100	461/500	Yes	?
w3m	Yes	No	No	Yes	N/A	N/A	No	No
WebPositive	Yes	No	Yes	Yes	98/100	358/500	No	No
xombrero	Yes	Yes	Yes	Yes	100/100	385/500	Yes	?

== See also ==
- Comparison of web browsers
- List of web browsers for Unix and Unix-like operating systems
