= QtWeb =

Web browser

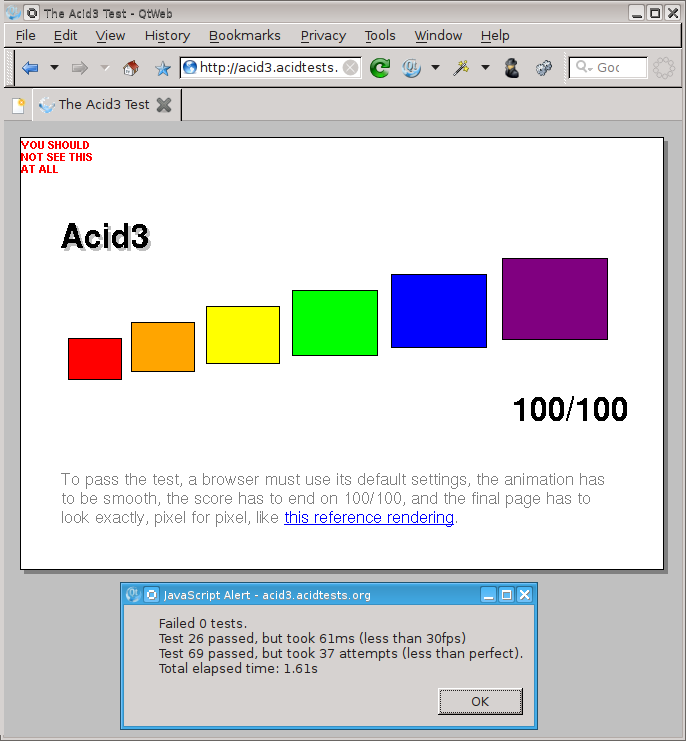
- Screenshot of QtWeb v3.8, having passed Acid3 test
- Developers: LogicWare & LSoft Technologies
- Initial release: December 2, 2008; 17 years ago
- Stable release: 3.8.5 / 9 September 2013
- Engine: WebKit
- Operating system: Windows 2000 and later; OS X 10.3 and later; Linux; PC-BSD
- Platform: Qt
- Type: Web browser
- License: GPL-2.0-or-later
- Website: web.archive.org/web/20241221000312/http://qtweb.net/

QtWeb is a discontinued free and open-source web browser developed by LogicWare & LSoft Technologies. QtWeb used the WebKit browser engine that was embedded in the Qt framework.

== Features ==
- Ad filtering (AdBlock function)
- BitTorrent download manager
- Bookmarks (including bookmarks import and aliases)
- Customisable keyboard shortcut
- Customisable search engines
- Customisable User Agent (Firefox, Internet Explorer, Safari, Chrome)
- Downloads manager
- Mouse gestures
- Privacy mode
- Pop-up blocking
- Portable version available
- Saving web sites in the PDF format
- Tabbed browsing
- Web Inspector for debugging, editing, and monitoring web pages

== Reception ==
QtWeb has been described as a lightweight web browser which offers some amount of customisable features, speed and simplicity to navigate. However it has been criticised for the lack of extensions support, no way to run Java and problems working with several websites.
