= Arora (web browser) =

Free and open-source web browser

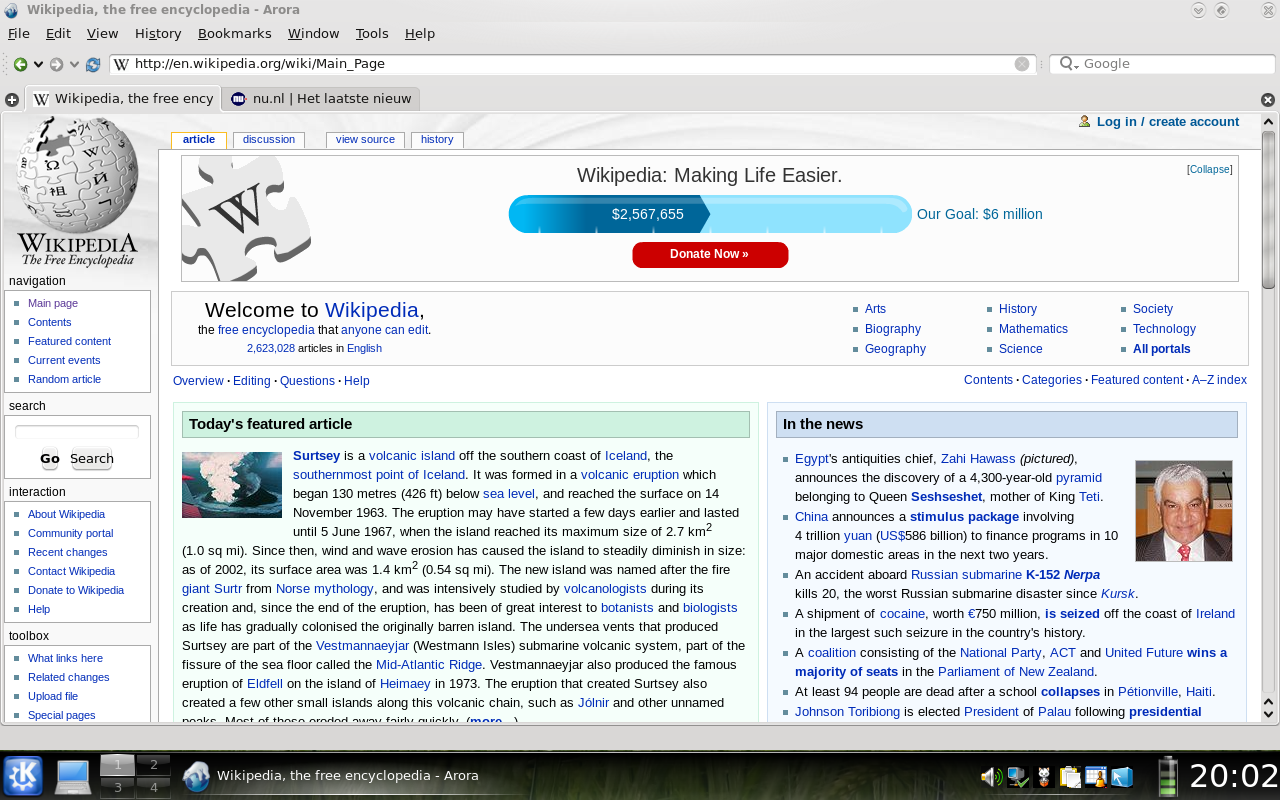
- Screenshot of Arora web browser on KDE 4.1
- Developer: Benjamin C. Meyer
- Final release: 0.11.0 / 27 September 2010; 15 years ago
- Written in: C++
- Engine: WebKit
- Operating system: BSD, Haiku, Linux, Mac OS X, OS/2, Windows
- Platform: Cross-platform
- Size: 1.2 MB (Linux)
- Available in: Multilanguage
- Type: Web browser
- License: GPL-2.0-or-later
- Website: github.com/arora/arora
- Repository: github.com/arora/arora

Arora is a discontinued free and open-source web browser developed by Benjamin C. Meyer. It was available for Linux, Mac OS X, Windows, FreeBSD, OS/2, Haiku, Genode, and any other operating system supported by the Qt toolkit. The browser's features included tabbed browsing, bookmarks, browsing history, smart location bar, OpenSearch, session management, privacy mode, a download manager, WebInspector, and AdBlock.

Meyer discontinued development of Arora due to strictures of non-compete clauses by his employer. Another software developer, Bastien Pederencino, forked Arora's source code, and published a variant called zBrowser – renamed Zeromus Browser in February 2013. Later in 2013, Pederencino published another variant called BlueLightCat. In 2014, some new patches were released on Arora's project page on GitHub, with some Linux distributions incorporating the changes in their individual versions of Arora packages in their repositories.

In 2020, Arora was forked again by another developer, Aaron Dewes, and a variant named "Endorphin Browser" was published, with the goal of modernizing Arora and adding new features.

== See also ==
- Comparison of lightweight web browsers
- Comparison of web browsers
- List of web browsers
- List of web browsers for Unix and Unix-like operating systems
- Qt (framework)
