= Pentadactyl =

Firefox extension

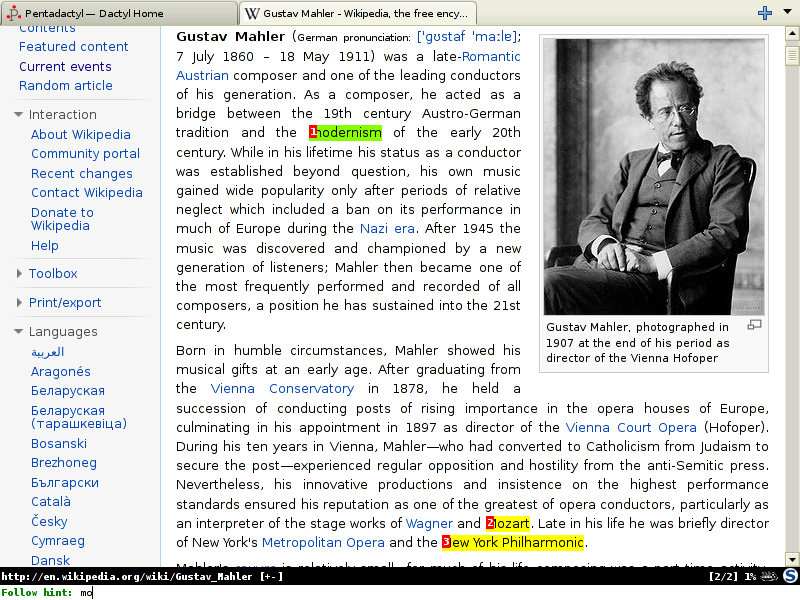
- Pentadactyl in hinted mode with scope of hinting filtered
- Developers: Doug Kearns, Kris Maglione
- Initial release: July 22, 2012
- Final release: 1.1 / March 15, 2014; 11 years ago
- Repository: github.com/5digits/dactyl
- Written in: JavaScript
- Operating system: Any
- Platform: Mozilla Firefox
- Size: 524 KB
- Available in: English
- Type: Add-on
- License: X11 license
- Website: github.com/5digits/dactyl

Pentadactyl was a Firefox extension forked from the Vimperator and designed to provide a more efficient user interface for keyboard-fluent users. The design is heavily inspired by the Vim text editor, and the authors try to maintain consistency with it wherever possible. It is now maintained as a Pale Moon extension.

== Features ==
Once activated, Pentadactyl removes all Firefox's default user interface chrome (except for the tab bar) and adds a Vim-inspired command line at the bottom of the window. The key bindings and dialog invocation are also changed to those familiar to Vim users.

Apart from Vim-like features, Pentadactyl includes the Lynx-like links hinting mode, allowing user to enter links manipulation commands referring to the links by labels or numbers.

As the key mappings of the Pentadactyl differ significantly from those typically expected by web application developers, occasional conflicts of browser- and site-defined key mapping occur. Pentadactyl deals with such cases by providing a special "pass-through" mode, which passes all the key press events (except for Esc key) directly to the site. This mode can either be activated manually or enforced on a per domain basis with a configuration file.

== Development ==
Pentadactyl was forked from the Vimperator Firefox extension after the disagreement over the project directions and governance. After the split Pentadactyl differentiated itself with improved start timing, ability to use the extension without restarting Firefox after installation and some changes for consistency with Vim.

The extension is available as stable releases and nightly builds.

As of November 2020, the project has been on hiatus since March 2017 due to developer inactivity and noncommunication, and doesn't seem to work on Firefox 57.0 (Firefox Quantum) or newer versions. The project was reported still working for Waterfox, Basilisk and Pale Moon browsers, but has since started to degrade due to no updates and will only work after applying community made patches. For the Pale Moon browser there is an actively maintained fork of Pentadactyl using the same name being hosted at GitHub.

=== Tridactyl ===
There is a WebExtension called Tridactyl, a Vimperator and Pentadactyl inspired Firefox-interface on GitHub

== Reception ==
In February 2011, Erez Zukerman of Download Squad described Pentadactyl as "probably the weirdest and coolest add-on we've ever seen."

In June 2011, Chad Perrin of TechRepublic noted: "As a former Vimperator user who has spent substantial time in surf, Uzbl, and Vimium, as well as more cursory time trying out other browsers and Chromium extensions that offer similar interface options, I am much happier with Pentadactyl than any of the alternatives. Its command functionality, in-application help documentation, completeness, configurability, stability, and (for those using the nightly builds, at least) currency are all superior to the other possibilities for vi-like keybindings in a browser."

== See also ==
- Conkeror
- Vimperator
- Xombrero
