= Xombrero =

Minimalistic web browser designed to replace Firefox

xombrero
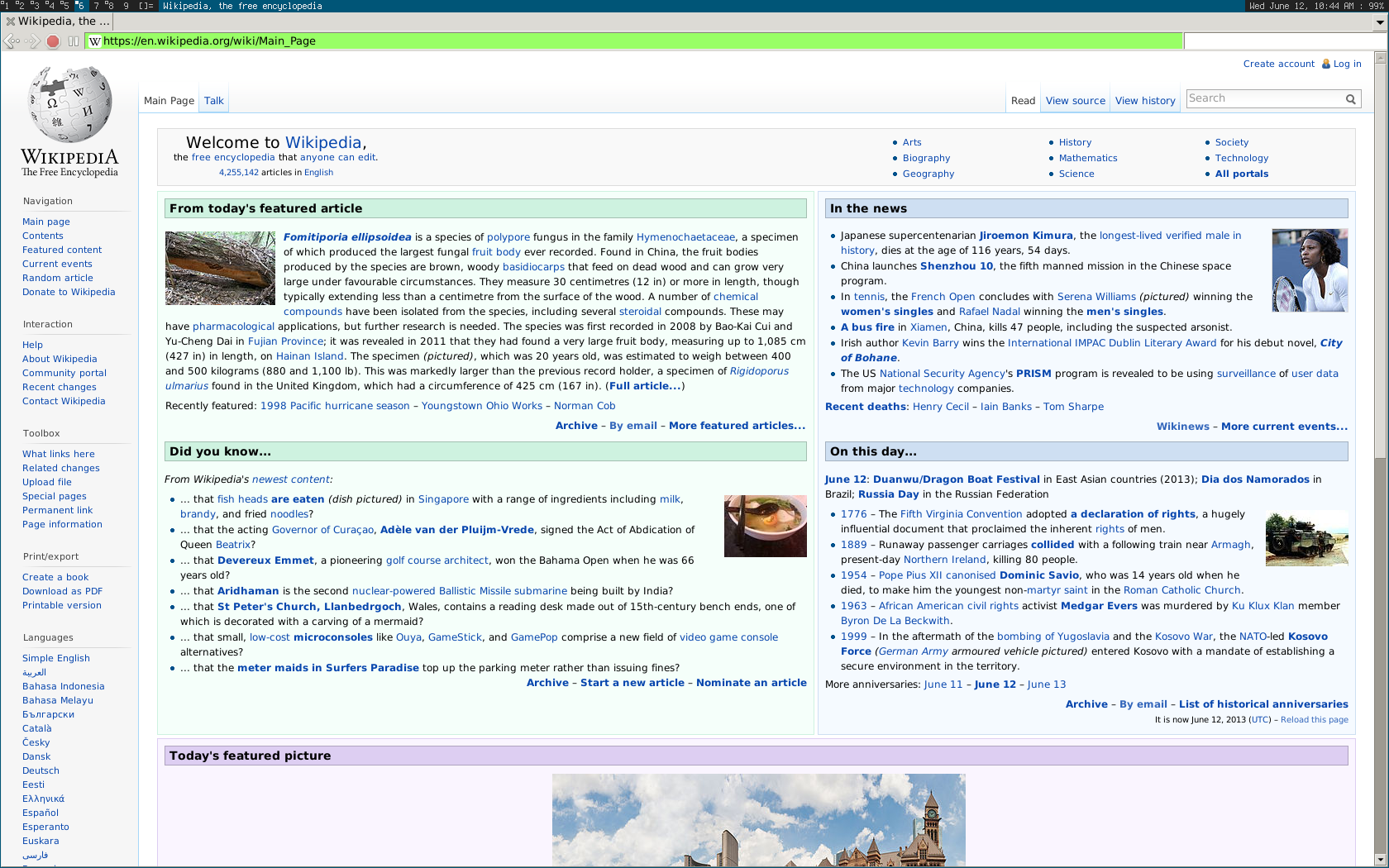
- OpenBSD desktop running xombrero 1.6.0
- Original author: Marco Peereboom
- Developers: Marco Peereboom, Stevan Andjelkovic, Edd Barrett, Todd T. Fries, Raphael Graf, Michal Mazurek, Josh Rickmar, David Hill
- Initial release: May 30, 2012
- Final release: 1.6.4 / 17 February 2015
- Repository: github.com/conformal/xombrero
- Written in: C, JavaScript
- Engine: WebKit
- Operating system: Unix-like, Windows
- Platform: Cross-platform
- Size: 0.2 MB
- Available in: English
- Type: Web browser
- License: ISC license
- Website: github.com/conformal/xombrero

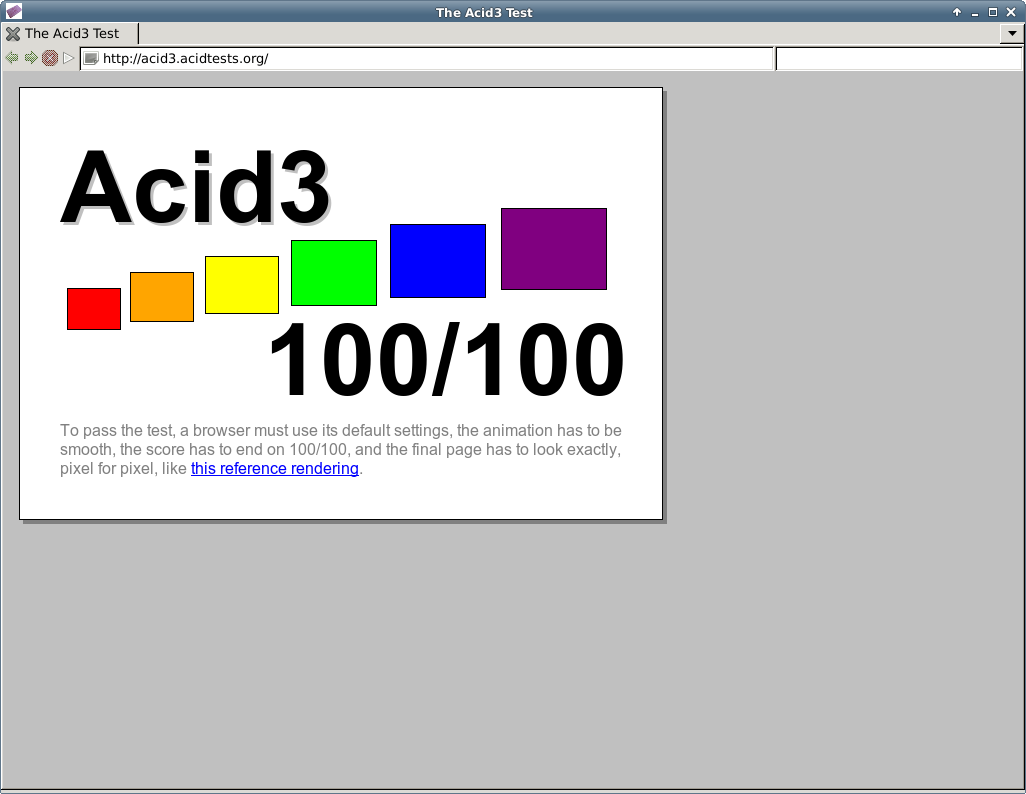
xombrero showing the Acid3 test results

xombrero (until 2012 known as xxxterm) is a discontinued open-source web browser developed with a goal to be a lightweight and secure replacement for full featured browsers like Firefox. The browser has found a niche among minimalist browsers for heavy keyboard users by balancing minimalism with usability.

xombrero is based on GTK+ 3.

== Features ==
xombrero is based on the WebKit engine and provides an ability to control cookies, plug-ins and JavaScript policies on per-website basis. The user can define the whitelists of trusted websites for each of those security risks.

xombrero was designed for experienced command-line interface users, so it includes the features typically requested by such an audience: mouseless browsing, no URL prefetch, vi-like user interface and navigation (including command mode), plain text file configuration, and link hinting.

== User interface ==
xombrero provides a command mode (designed after vi) for entering commands for the common tasks, including tabs (buffers) switching, entering URLs, following links and navigating through browser history and bookmarks. The same functionality can be accessed with keyboard shortcuts.

By default xombrero window contains two panels, providing the ordinary layout of a web browser window. The first one (on the top) – "fancy bar" – provides URL entry, backward, forward, stop and white-list toggle buttons and optional search string entry. Another panel (on the bottom) – "status bar" – reports the current URL (or page title), zoom level and position in page. With these panels enabled and a mouse attached, the user may operate xombrero like Firefox or Midori.

== History ==
The development of the browser began in February 2010 under the name "xxxterm" by several OpenBSD users specifically for that operating system. Initially the releases of the browsers were identified by CVS revision numbers, though more common "X.Y.Z" version numbering scheme was introduced as development moved to Git.

In the release announcement for version 1.11.2, Peereboom revealed the plan to rename xxxterm to xombrero, though an emergency release under the old name happened later the same day. Later it was revealed that the version numbers for the browser under the new name would start again from 1.0.

In early 2017, it appeared the project was likely to be discontinued, as xombrero depended on an old version of WebKit which had multiple security vulnerabilities, and a port to a modern version of WebKit would be difficult. Due to these issues, OpenBSD removed xombrero from its ports tree on 1 February 2017.

== See also ==
- qutebrowser
- surf (discontinued)
- Conkeror
- Pentadactyl
- Uzbl (discontinued)
- Vimperator
