= Qutebrowser =

Free web browser with a minimal GUI

qutebrowser
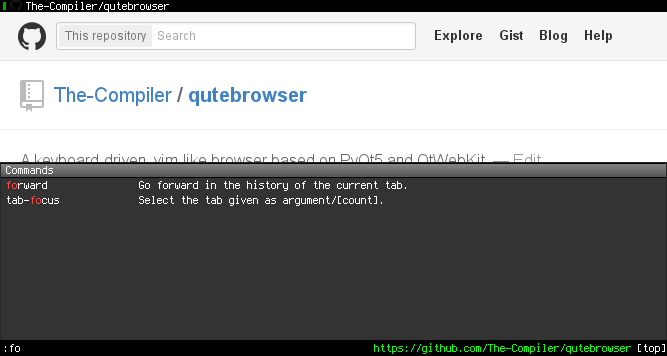
- qutebrowser running in the command mode.
- Original author: Freya Bruhin ("the Compiler")
- Developers: Freya Bruhin; contributors
- Initial release: 14 December 2014; 11 years ago
- Stable release: 3.6.3 / 30 November 2025; 3 months ago
- Written in: Python, JavaScript
- Engine: WebKit or QtWebEngine
- Operating system: Linux, Windows, macOS, FreeBSD, OpenBSD
- Available in: 1 languages
- List of languages English
- Type: Web browser
- License: GNU General Public License
- Website: qutebrowser.org
- Repository: github.com/qutebrowser/qutebrowser

qutebrowser (pronounced "cute browser") is a web browser for the operating systems Linux, Windows, and macOS, with vim-style key bindings and a minimal graphical user interface (GUI). It is keyboard-driven and is inspired by similar software such as Vimperator and dwb. It is developed by Freya Bruhin.

Qutebrowser is free and open-source software released under the GNU General Public License, and is included in the native repositories of Linux distributions such as Fedora and Arch Linux.

Qutebrowser can use two layout or browser engines: QtWebEngine by default, or WebKit optionally instead. It uses DuckDuckGo as the default search engine.

== See also ==
- List of web browsers
- uzbl – another minimalist web browser with similar concept (discontinued)
- Minimalism (computing)
