= NetSurf =

Open source web browser

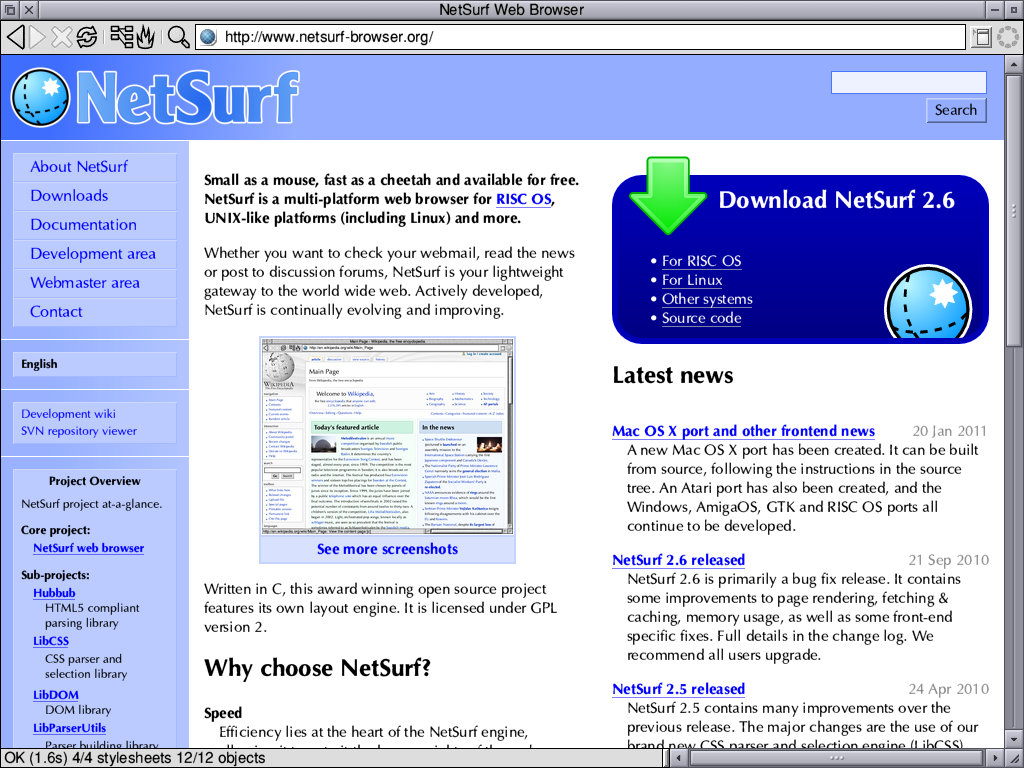
- NetSurf running on RISC OS
- Developer: The NetSurf Developers
- Release: May 19, 2007; 19 years ago
- Stable release: 3.11 / 28 December 2023; 2 years ago
- Preview release: Public Autobuilder (n/a) [±]
- Written in: ANSI C
- Operating system: Official: RISC OS, AmigaOS 4, Windows; Linux/Unix-like, BeOS/Haiku, Atari TOS, macOS; 3rd party ports: AmigaOS 4, AmigaOS 3, Caanoo, MorphOS, Samsung TVs, RedoxOS, Nintendo 3DS, Plan 9; KolibriOS port in development
- Size: 4.0 MB (RISC OS); 6.9 MB (AmigaOS)
- Type: Web browser
- License: GPL-2.0-only
- Website: www.netsurf-browser.org
- Repository: git.netsurf-browser.org/netsurf.git

NetSurf is an open-source web browser which uses its own layout engine. Its design goal is to be lightweight and portable. NetSurf provides features including tabbed browsing, bookmarks, and page thumbnailing.

The NetSurf project was started in April 2002 in response to a discussion of the deficiencies of the RISC OS platform's existing web browsers. Shortly after the project's inception, development versions for RISC OS users were made available for download by the project's automated build system. NetSurf was voted "Best non-commercial software" four times in Drobe Launchpad's annual RISC OS awards between 2004 and 2008.

NetSurf supports both mainstream systems (e.g. macOS and Unix-like) and older or uncommon platforms (e.g. AmigaOS, Haiku, Atari TOS, RISC OS, and Redox).

The browser was ranked in 2011 as number 8 in an article highlighting 10 browsers for Linux published in TechRepublic and ZDNet.

== Features ==
NetSurf's multi-platform core is written in ANSI C, and implements most of the HTML 4 and CSS 2.1 specifications using its own bespoke layout engine. As of version 2.0, NetSurf uses Hubbub, an HTML parser that follows the HTML5 specification. As well as rendering GIF, JPEG, PNG and BMP images, the browser also supports formats native to RISC OS, including Sprite, Draw and ArtWorks files.

It was suggested by developer John-Mark Bell in 2007 that support for JavaScript could be added. This feature did not make it into NetSurf v2 back in 2008, nor into NetSurf v3 of 2013, but as of December 2012 there are some NetSurf preview-builds available which contain early-stage JavaScript support (later much improved). On April 20, 2013, NetSurf 3.0 was released.

== History ==
NetSurf began in April 2002 as a web browser for the RISC OS platform. Work on a GTK port began in June 2004 to aid development and debugging. It has since gained many of the user interface features present in the RISC OS version. The browser is packaged with several distributions including Ubuntu, NetBSD, and OpenBSD.

After five years of development, the first stable version of the browser was released on 19 May 2007 to coincide with the Wakefield RISC OS show. Version 1.0 was made available for download from the project's web site and the software was sold on CD at the show. After the release of NetSurf 1.0 there were two point-releases, which largely comprised bug fixes. NetSurf 1.1 was released in August 2007 and in March 2008 the NetSurf 1.2 release was made available.

NetSurf participated in Google Summer of Code in 2008 as a mentoring organisation, running four projects. These included improving the GTK front end, adding paginated PDF export support and developing the project's HTML 5 compliant parsing library, Hubbub. All NetSurf development builds since 11 August 2008 have used Hubbub to parse HTML and it is available for use in other projects under the MIT license.

NetSurf was again accepted as a mentoring organisation into Google Summer of Code 2009. The projects they ran included the development of LibDOM, the project's Document Object Model, and improvement of NetSurf's user interface. The interface work included moving previously RISC OS-only functionality to the multi-platform core, including bookmarks, global history, cookie management and page search features. A port to the Windows operating system was also started. In 2010 the NetSurf project did not apply to participate in Google Summer of Code due to the developers having other commitments.

=== Version history ===
| Version number | Release date | Notes |
|---|---|---|
| 1.0 | 2007-05-19 | First stable release |
| 1.1 | 2007-08 | |
| 1.2 | 2008-03 | |
| 2.0 | 2009-04 | First release for AmigaOS and BeOS/Haiku, first release to use the project's HTML5 parsing library, Hubbub. |
| 2.1 | 2009-05 | Incorporated bug fixes and some improvements to page layout. |
| 2.5 | 2010-04 | This was the first release to use the project's library for CSS parsing and selection, LibCSS and a new internal cache for fetched content. |
| 2.6 | 2010-09 | Included a number of fixes and improvements. |
| 2.7 | 2011-04 | First version released for Mac OS X. Added bookmarking (called the Hotlist manager in NetSurf), cookie, and history management features. |
| 2.8 | 2011-09 | Added support for frames and iframes in the browser's core rendering engine, making them available to all front ends. The release included support for MIME type sniffing and improved the performance of loading the images used by a web page. |
| 2.9 | 2012-04 | New multi-tasking behaviour, optimised URL handling, fetcher optimisations, cache optimisations, and faster CSS selection. |
| 3.0 | 2013-04 | First release to use the LibDOM Document Object Modeling library. New textarea support, ability to fetch and parse CSS in parallel with HTML documents, extensive behind-the-scenes refactoring, and a host of smaller changes and fixes. |
| 3.1 | 2014-04 | Faster CSS selection performance, faster start up time, new look and feel to the treeviews (hotlist/bookmarks, global history and cookie manager), improved options handling, undo/redo support in textareas, and general improvement of forms. Also included are many other additions, optimisations and bug fixes. |
| 3.9 | 2019-07 | Added support for CSS Media Queries (level 4) and improvements to JavaScript handling |
| 3.10 | 2020-05 | Improvements in scaling on the RISC OS version. The release added some HTML updates and updated Duktape to 2.4.0. The update had an overhaul of the GTK version and better authentication handling. |
| 3.11 | 2023-12-28 | Released with CSS flex support and many optimisations and enhancements. |

== Ports ==
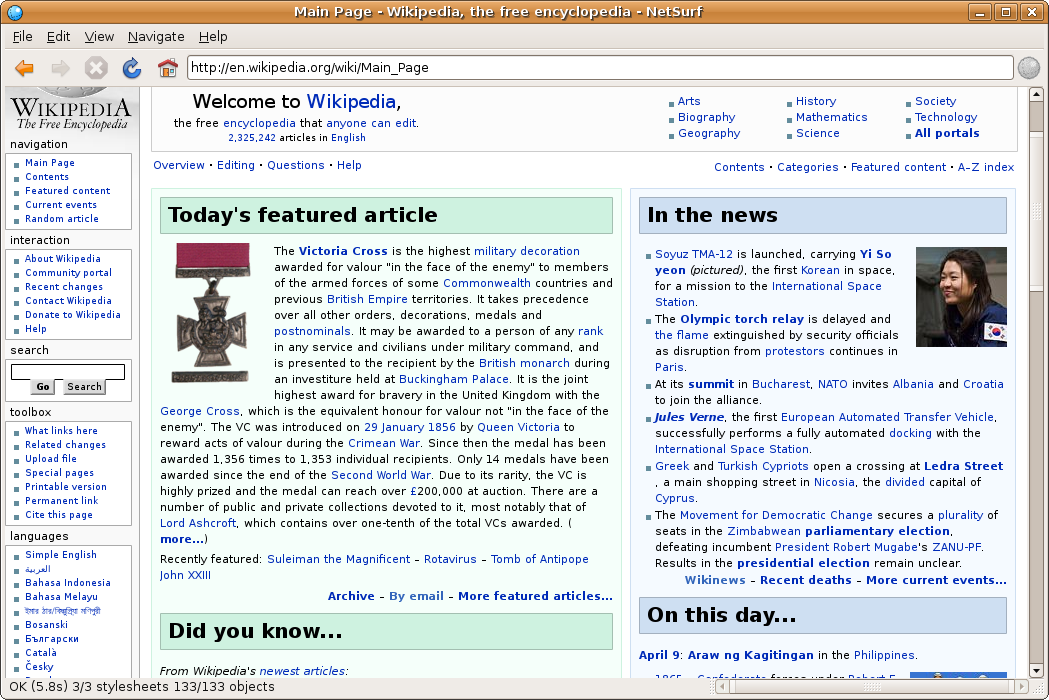
GTK NetSurf running under Linux

A native BeOS/Haiku port has been developed. Since the GTK version was built for AmigaOS, using Cygnix which provides an X11 environment, a native AmigaOS port has also been developed. In January 2009, NetSurf was made available on MorphOS, an operating system that is API-compatible with AmigaOS. A Windows port is also available for download.

A framebuffer port was created in September 2008. Unlike the other ports, it does not use any GUI toolkit, but instead renders its own mouse pointer, scrollbars and other widgets. The framebuffer frontend has been used to create a web kiosk on embedded systems. The Plan 9 port is also based on it.

In January 2010, the NetSurf Developers announced the release of what they expected at the time to be the last release for RISC OS. Lead developer John-Mark Bell said at the time "Realistically, the people qualified to maintain the RISC OS port are up to their necks in other stuff." Subsequently, Steve Fryatt volunteered himself as maintainer.

January 2011 saw the announcement of a Mac OS X port. A port to Atari 16-bit and 32-bit computers was also started in January 2011.

An unofficial Nintendo 3DS port of NetSurf has been developed that includes TLS 1.2 support.

== See also ==
- Dillo
- Timeline of web browsers
- Comparison of web browsers
- Comparison of lightweight web browsers
- List of web browsers
