= Falkon =

Free and open-source web browser

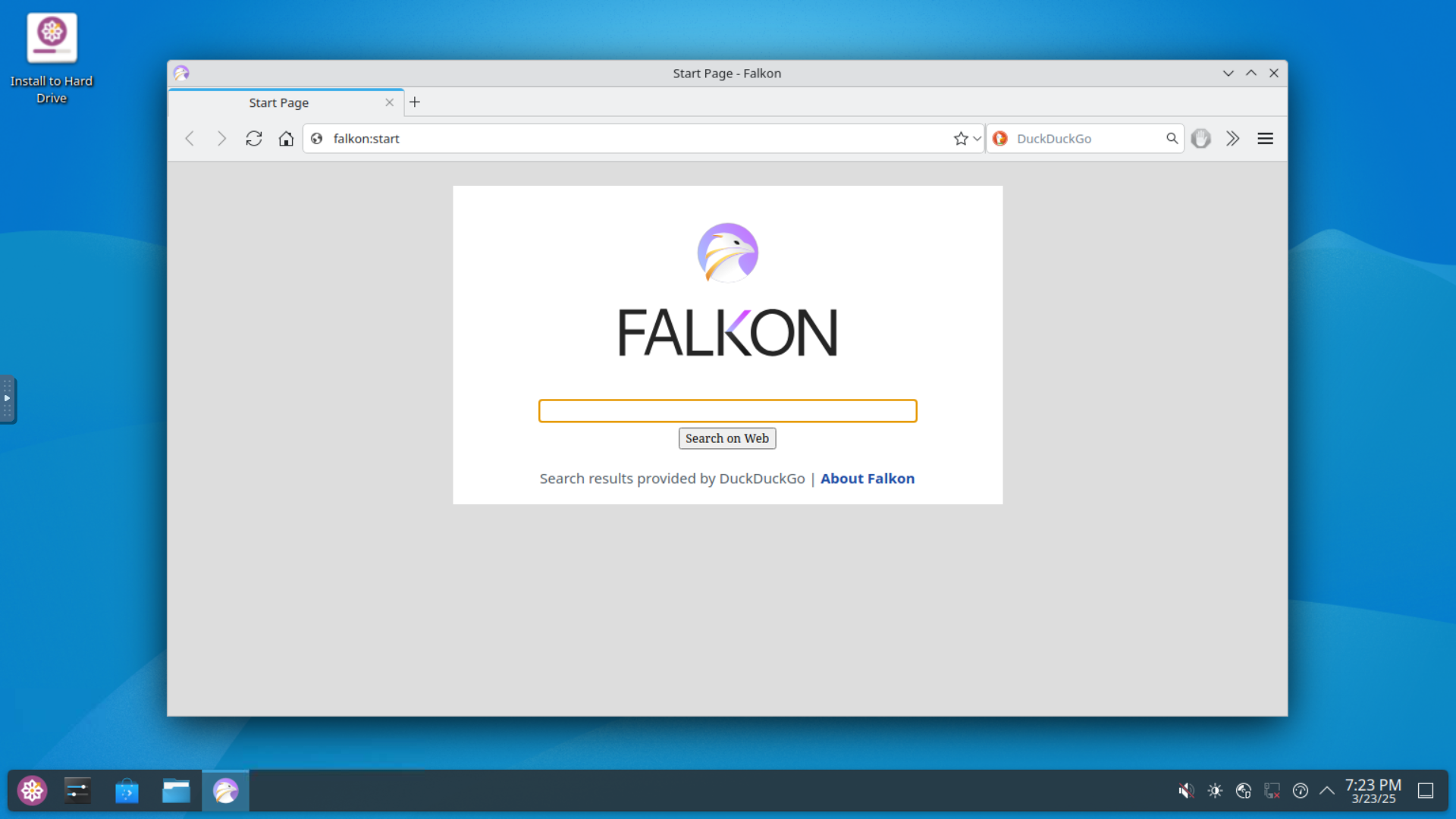
- Falkon 24.12.0
- Original author: David Rosca
- Developer: KDE
- Initial release: December 2010
- Stable release: 25.04.3 / 3 July 2025; 5 months ago
- Repository: invent.kde.org/network/falkon
- Written in: C++
- Engine: Qt WebEngine
- Operating system: Unix-like (Linux, FreeBSD, etc), Haiku, Windows 7 or later
- Platform: Qt framework
- Included with: KaOS, openMandriva Lx
- Available in: Multilingual
- Type: Web browser
- License: GPL-3.0-or-later
- Website: www.falkon.org

Falkon (formerly QupZilla) is a free and open-source web browser developed by KDE. It is built on the QtWebEngine, which is a wrapper for the Chromium browser core.

Both KaOS and openMandriva Lx use Falkon as their default browser.

== Features ==
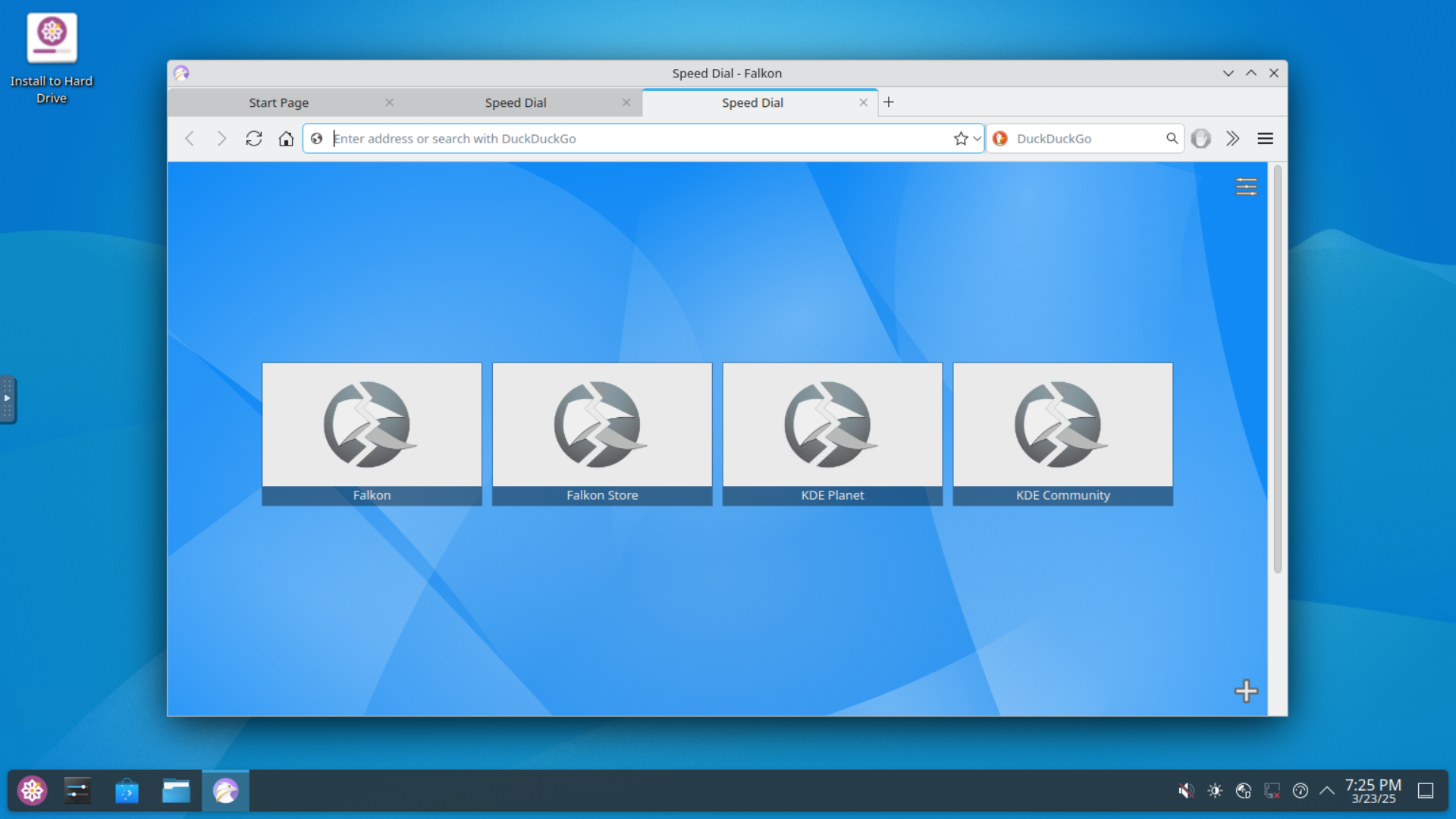
Speed dial

Falkon provides several icon sets and other elements to match the native look and feel of users' desktop operating systems. Some additional features of the browser include the integration of history, web feeds and bookmarks in a single location, the ability to take a screenshot of the entire page, and an Opera-like "Speed dial" home page. It is reported to consume fewer system resources than the major general purpose browsers like Firefox and Google Chrome.

Falkon uses the Qt cross-platform application framework and offers a built-in AdBlock. By default this adblocker whitelists the web page of Falkon's main search engine, DuckDuckGo. A "portable" (no installation) version for Windows platforms exists. Falkon is also distributed in the PortableApps format.

== History ==
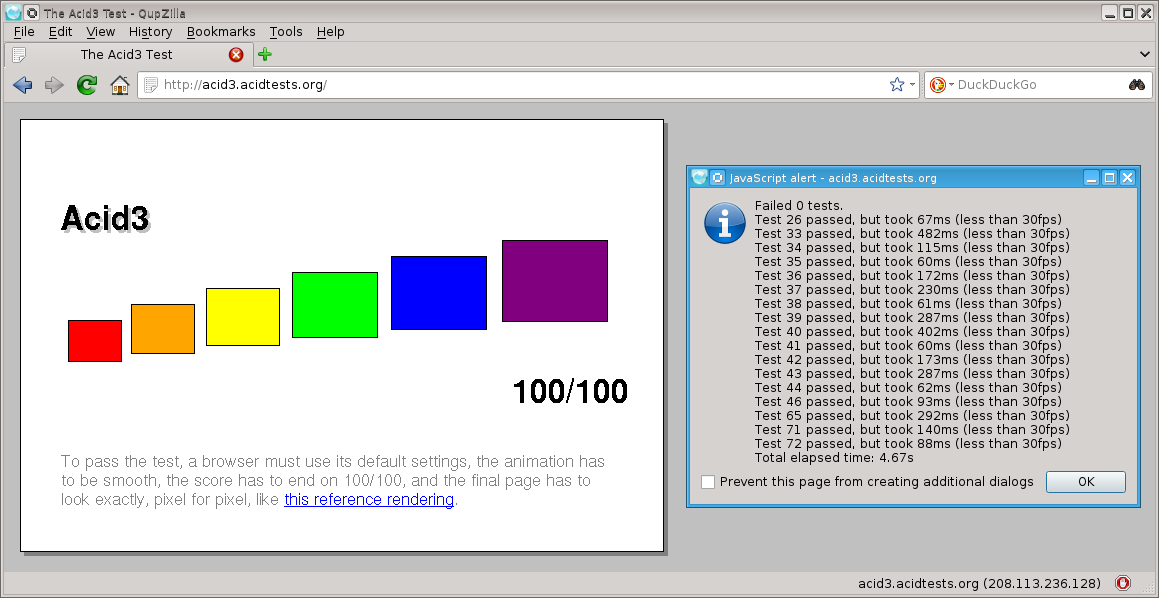
QupZilla v1.7.0 passed the Acid3 test.

The project was started as a research project in 2010. The first preview release, written in Python (using PyQt library), was ready by December 2010. In 2011 the source code was rewritten in C++ with a goal to create a full-featured general purpose portable web browser based on QtWebKit, with the initial target being visual integration with the look and feel of multiple desktop environments including Microsoft Windows, GNOME, and KDE Plasma. Version 1.6.6 (May 2014) still supported Windows 2000.

On 30 March 2016, QupZilla 2.0 was released. It marked the transition from QtWebKit to QtWebEngine.

On 10 August 2017, QupZilla's developer David Rosca announced in a blog post that QupZilla had become a KDE project. After the release of Qupzilla 2.2 the project was renamed to Falkon. KDE Falkon 3.0 was released on 27 February 2018.

Falkon 3.0.1 was included in Lubuntu 18.10 beta but replaced with Firefox in the actual Lubuntu 18.10 release.

Falkon 3.2.0 was released on 31 January 2022.

On 14 February 2022, Falkon started transitioning to KDE Gear by adopting the same version number. Starting with version 22.04 on 21 April 2022, the first version of Falkon as part of KDE Gear was released. Official releases are thus announced on the KDE news website rather than the official Falkon website.

== See also ==
- Comparison of lightweight web browsers
- Comparison of web browsers
- List of web browsers
- List of web browsers for Unix and Unix-like operating systems
