= USBL (disambiguation) =

The United States Basketball League (USBL) was a 1995–2008 professional men's basketball league.

USBL may also refer to:

- United States Basketball League (2026)
- United States Baseball League (1912)
- Ultra-short baseline acoustic positioning system, an underwater navigation and communication method

== See also ==
- Uzbl
