= Falkon (disambiguation) =

Falkon is a web browser

Falkon may also refer to:

- Lee Falkon, Israeli football player
- Falkon (convention), Polish science fiction convention
- Falkon, a recurring character from Lords of the Ultra-Realm comic book series
