= Redox (operating system) =

Microkernel OS written in Rust

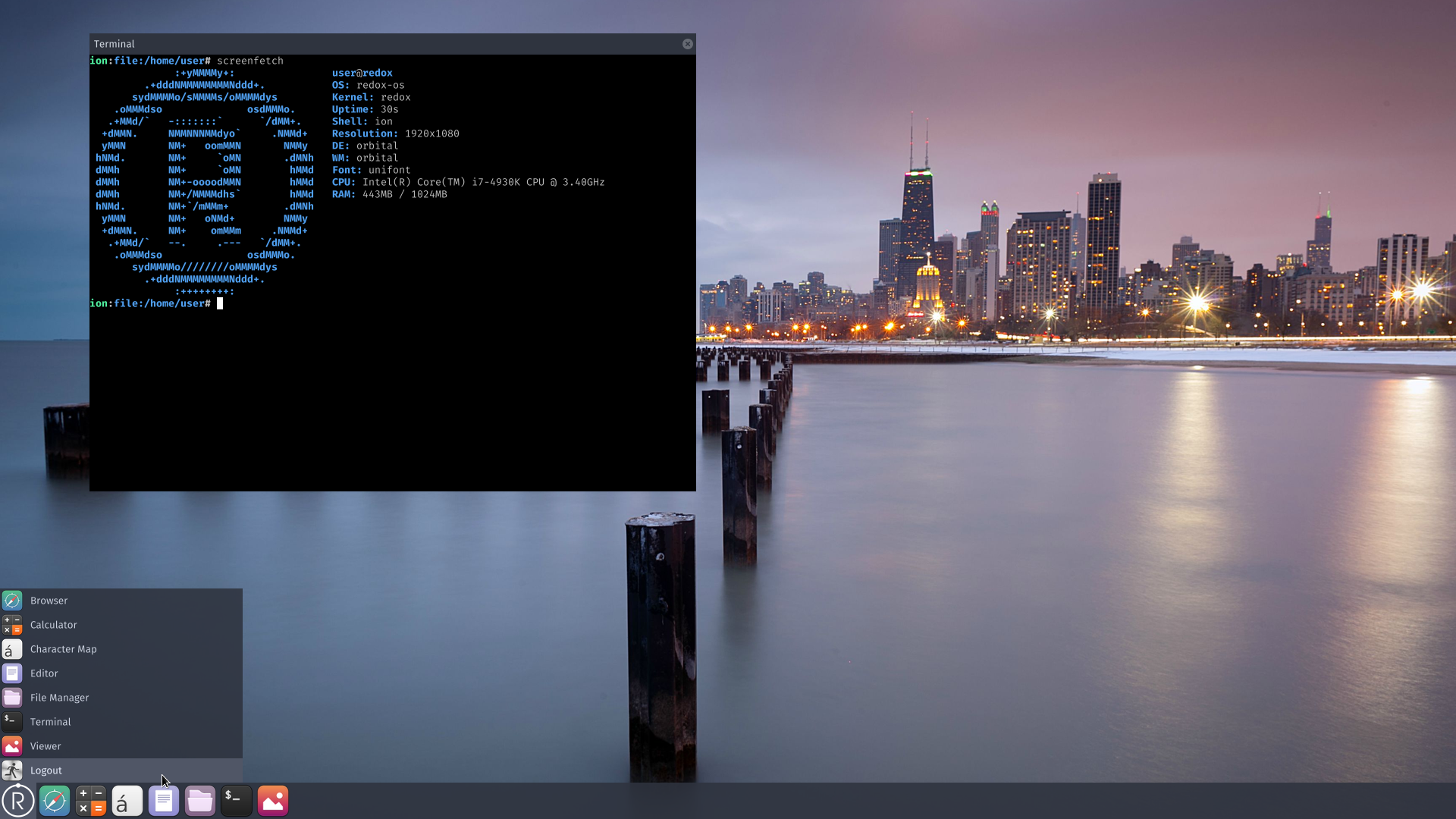
- Redox running Ion shell in Orbital windowing system
- Developer: Jeremy Soller, Redox Developers
- Written in: Rust, assembly
- OS family: Unix-like
- Working state: Current
- Source model: Free software
- Initial release: 20 April 2015; 11 years ago
- Latest preview: 0.9.0 / 9 September 2024; 2 years ago
- Repository: gitlab.redox-os.org/redox-os/redox
- Marketing target: Desktop, workstation, server
- Available in: English
- Package manager: pkgutils
- Supported platforms: IA-32, AMD64, AArch64, RISC-V
- Kernel type: Microkernel
- Userland: Custom
- Influenced by: POSIX
- Default user interface: Command-line, Orbital
- License: MIT
- Official website: www.redox-os.org

Redox is a Unix-like operating system based on a microkernel design. It is community-developed, released as free and open-source software and distributed under an MIT License. Written in the programming language Rust, Redox aims to be a general-purpose operating system that is safe and reliable. It is currently in a pre-stable status.

== Development ==
Redox was created by Jeremy Soller and was first published on 20 April 2015 on GitHub. Redox gets its name from the reduction-oxidation reactions in chemistry; one redox reaction is the corrosion of iron, also called rust. Soller himself is also an engineer at System76.

Redox has a focus on safety, stability, and performance. It is inspired by prior kernels and operating systems, such as SeL4, MINIX, Plan 9, BSD, and Linux. Current platform targets include 32-bit and 64-bit x86, AArch64, and 64-bit RISC-V.

As of September 2024, the Redox repository had a total of 97 contributors. The OS is not yet stable.

Andrew S. Tanenbaum, the author of MINIX, commented in 2025 that Redox "has real potential, but it is not there yet, but is worth watching...."

== Components and apps ==
Redox provides packages (memory allocator, file system, display manager, core utilities, etc.) that together make up a functional operating system. Redox relies on an ecosystem of software written in Rust by members of the project. These include the Redox kernel, the Ralloc memory allocator, and the RedoxFS file system which is inspired by the ZFS file system.

pkgutils is Redox's package manager, while relibc is the C standard library. It has a display and window manager named Orbital, which manages the display, and handles requests for window creation, redraws, and event polling. Ion is Redox's shell, it is written in Rust and not compatible with POSIX shells.

Redox includes a command-line interface (CLI) text editor similar to vi, called Sodium. There are numerous graphical user interface (GUI) applications preloaded including a web browser (NetSurf) that uses its own layout engine, a file manager (File Browser), an ANSI type terminal emulator (Orbterm), and various other tools like a software calculator and text editor.

As of May 2024, several applications from the COSMIC desktop, like the terminal emulator, file manager and text editor have been incorporated into Redox.

== See also ==
- Rust for Linux
- LynxOS
