= Iris Browser =

Windows Mobile web browser

- Iris Browser 1.15 Screenshot
- Developer(s): Torch Mobile
- Initial release: 2008
- Final release: 1.1.9 (July 6, 2009; 15 years ago) [±]
- Operating system: Windows Mobile, Windows CE
- Type: Mobile browser
- License: Proprietary
- Website: www.torchmobile.com

Iris Browser is a discontinued web browser for Windows Mobile smartphones and personal digital assistants (PDAs) developed by the Torch Mobile company. The first version was released in 2008. It was one of the first mobile browsers to score a perfect 100 on the Acid3 test.

RIM acquired Torch Mobile in 2009 and discontinued Iris.

== Features ==
Iris is based on the WebKit rendering engine with the SquirrelFish Extreme JavaScript engine, Netscape plug-in API, and JavaScript/ECMAScript 1.5.

It has HTML and CSS support and supports SVG, XPath, and XSLT.

It supports a customizable interface and touch screen control, pop-up blockers, and XHTML 1.x mobile profile support.

It has advanced security features, advanced mobile key navigation, HTTP cache optimized for low disk usage, History Auto-Complete, and SSL and authenticated proxy support.

It also features bookmarks, which can be customized by the carrier, tabs, and customizable about pages.

== Performance ==
According to independent testing, Iris 1.1.5 loads pages more slowly than its closest competitor, Opera Mobile. The UI was greatly enhanced all the way up until 1.1.9 which was released on July 6, 2009.

According to testing done by Torch Mobile, Iris 1.1.2 outperformed Access NetFront 3.5 and Opera Mobile 9.5 in the SunSpider JavaScript benchmark.
