= Otter Browser =

Free and open source web browser

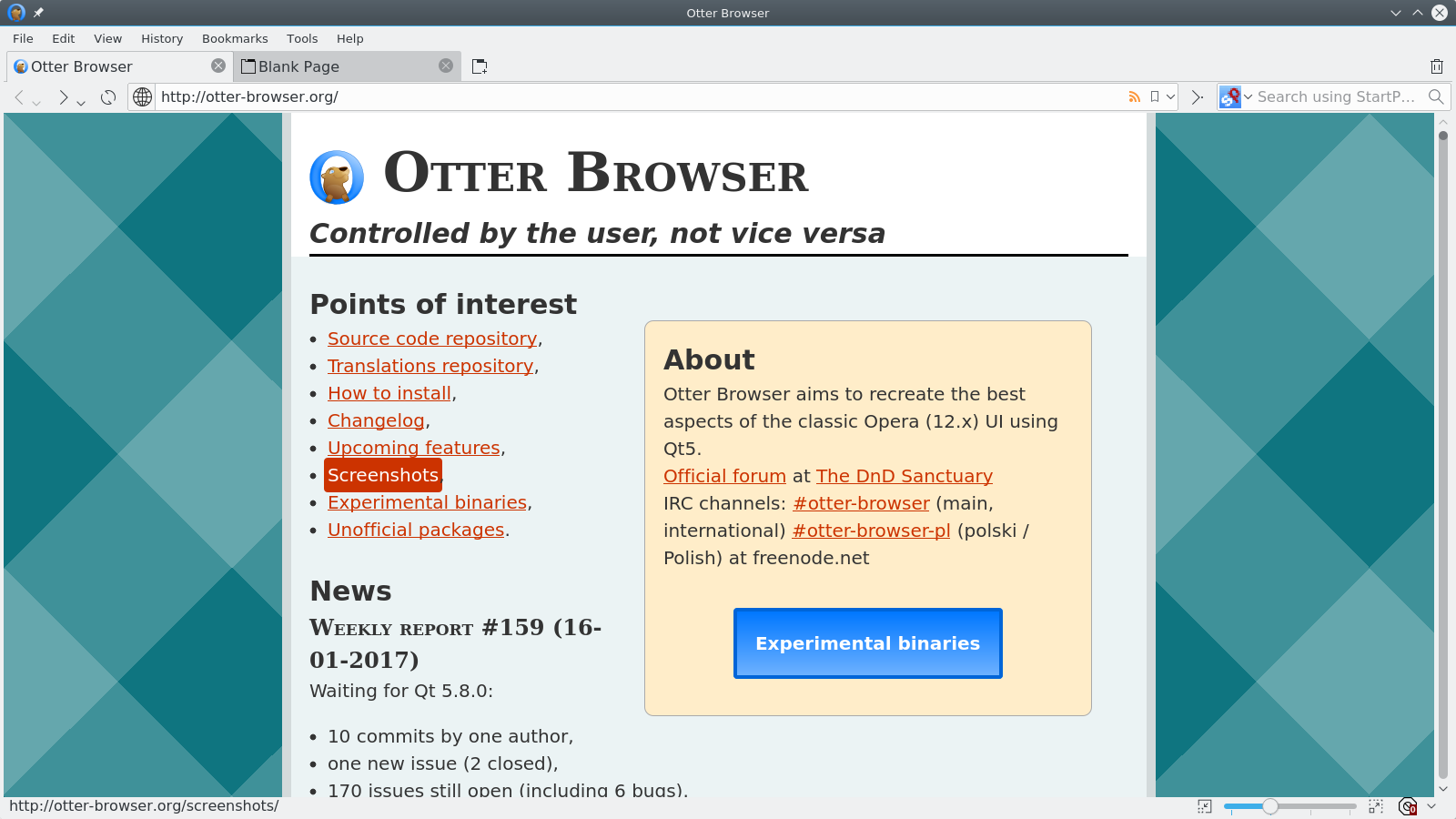
- Otter Browser using Breeze style on KDE Plasma 5
- Developer: Michał Dutkiewicz
- Release: January 1, 2014; 12 years ago
- Stable release: 1.0.03 / 22 February 2022; 4 years ago
- Written in: C++
- Engines: QtWebEngine, QtWebKit
- Operating system: Unix-like (Linux, FreeBSD, OpenBSD), macOS, Windows, Haiku, RISC OS, ArcaOS
- Platform: Qt
- Type: Web browser
- License: GPL 3.0 or later
- Website: otter-browser.org
- Repository: github.com/OtterBrowser/otter-browser

Otter Browser is a cross-platform web browser that aims to recreate aspects of Opera 12.x using the Qt framework. It is free and open-source software licensed under the GNU General Public License (GPL) 3.0 or later. It works on Linux-based operating systems, FreeBSD, OpenBSD, macOS, Haiku, RISC OS, OS/2, and Windows platforms.

== History ==
The author of the software, Michał Dutkiewicz, began work on Otter Browser in 2014 due to versions of Opera after Opera 12 not having Linux versions at the time; and because he was dissatisfied with the changes made and features removed in builds after Opera 12.

Early versions of the browser were released starting in January 2014 as an alpha. The browser started out using QtWebEngine because Presto was closed source. The browser was designed to be modular and allow for customization, instead of being a 1:1 recreation of Opera.

Otter Browser was ported to RISC OS in 2019 as OBrowser, although it was noted that it did not behave like a standard RISC OS application.

The first stable release came in 2019.

The browser and QT5 were ported to OS/2 in 2022 because the latest browser OS/2 could run was the outdated Firefox 49.

== Features ==
The browser runs on QtWebEngine, which is a version of Blink, the web engine used by Chromium. The web browser was designed to have integration with the KDE Plasma and Unity desktop environments. Otter Browser has a built-in feed reader for RSS and Atom, a note-taking utility, and cookie management accessible from a sidebar. It also includes a built-in content blocker and popup blocker, session management, password manager, bookmarking, userscript support, and privacy features such as 'do not track'.

As of 2019, tab grouping, form auto-complete, extensions support, and a mail client were planned to be implemented in future versions of the browser.

== Reception ==
Otter Browser has been praised for its aim to recreate classic Opera features and its modularity. Praise was also given to its lightweight nature and navigable user interface. Some cons that have been noted are that the user interface may be ugly to some users as it does not support theming, it does not support extensions, and it may not have standout features compared to other browsers.
