= Eww (web browser) =

For GNU Emacs

eww
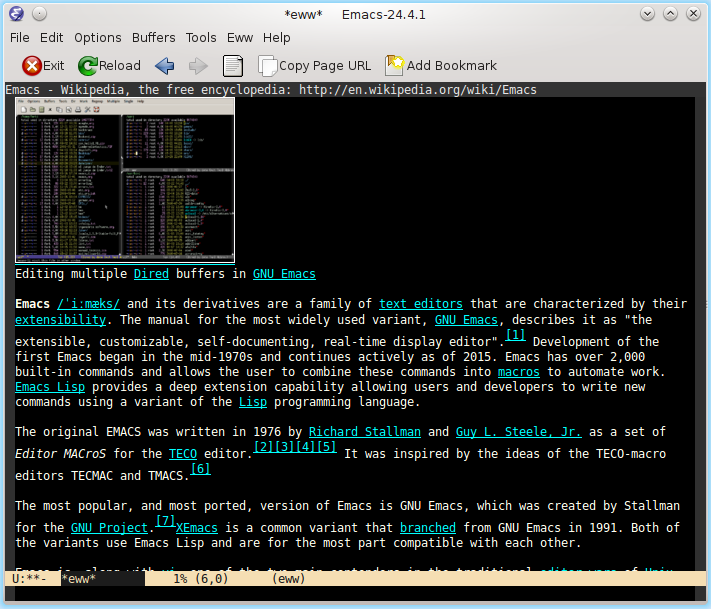
- A rendering of the Emacs article on English Wikipedia by eww
- Developer: Lars Magne Ingebrigtsen
- Written in: Emacs Lisp
- Operating system: Cross-platform
- Type: Web browser
- License: GPL-3.0-or-later
- Website: GNU Emacs manual
- Repository: git.savannah.gnu.org/cgit/emacs.git/tree/lisp/net/eww.el

Emacs Web Wowser (a backronym of "eww") is a lightweight web browser within the GNU Emacs text editor. Eww can only do basic rendering of HTML; there is no capability for executing JavaScript or handling the intricacies of CSS. It was developed by Lars Magne Ingebrigtsen, who also created the underlying HTML rendering library.

== See also ==
- w3m used with emacs-w3m interface
- Emacs/W3
