= Tkhtml =

Discontinued open source browser engine

- Hv3 using Tkhtml to render the Wikipedia front page
- Developer: Liem Bahneman
- Written in: C, Tcl
- Operating system: UNIX, other
- Type: Browser engine, WYSIWYG HTML editor
- License: BSD
- Website: tkhtml.tcl.tk

Tkhtml is a discontinued open-source browser engine written in C using the Tk widget toolkit. It was used primarily by the Html Viewer 3 (Hv3) minimalist web browser.

Version 1 was written using the XF application builder, but because of functionality reasons this part was rewritten. In 2006, it was announced that a public build of Tkhtml Alpha 10 had passed the Acid2 test.

To run Tkhtml, the Tcl/Tk framework needed to be installed. Then the standard wish interpreter needed to be replaced by the wwwish interpreter to use the WYSIWYG previewing function. Tkhtml can still be run through the use of bindings to other programming languages. The TkinterWeb package, for example, can be used to embed Tkhtml in Python Tkinter applications.
