= Dillo =

Minimal, lightweight web browser

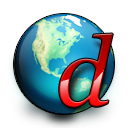

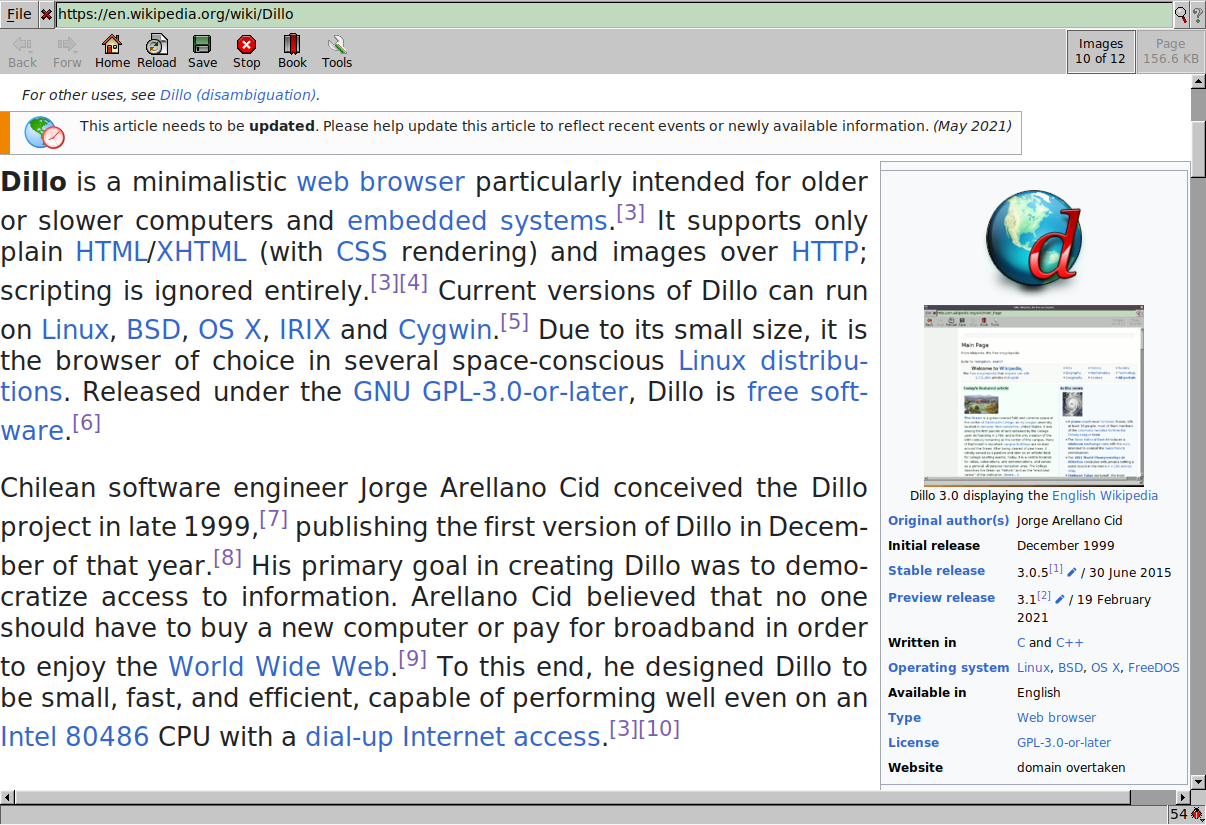
- Dillo 3.1 displaying a Wikipedia article
- Original author: Jorge Arellano Cid
- Developer: Rodrigo Arias Mallo
- Release: December 1999; 26 years ago
- Stable release: 3.3.0 / 26 April 2026; 5 months ago
- Written in: C and C++
- Operating system: Linux, BSD, macOS, FreeDOS
- Available in: English
- Type: Web browser
- License: GPL-3.0-or-later
- Website: dillo-browser.org
- Repository: git.dillo-browser.org/dillo

Dillo is a minimalistic web browser particularly intended for old or slow computers and embedded systems. It supports only plain HTML/XHTML (with CSS rendering) and images over HTTP and HTTPS; scripting is ignored entirely. Current versions of Dillo can run on Linux, BSD, macOS, IRIX and Cygwin. Due to its small size, it is a popular choice for lightweight Linux distributions. Dillo is free software, released under the GNU GPL-3.0-or-later.

Chilean software engineer Jorge Arellano Cid conceived the Dillo project in late 1999, publishing the first version of Dillo in December of that year. His primary goal in creating Dillo was to democratize access to information. Arellano Cid believed that no one should have to buy a new computer or pay for broadband in order to enjoy the World Wide Web. To this end, he designed Dillo to be small, fast, and efficient, capable of performing well even on an Intel 80486 CPU with a dial-up Internet access.

== Development ==
Dillo was originally written in the C programming language with the GTK+ GUI toolkit. The first versions were based on an earlier browser called Armadillo, hence the name.

Dillo is funded by private donations; efforts to obtain public grants and corporate sponsors have been unsuccessful. Lack of funding led to a slowdown in development in 2006, and a complete stop in 2007. The project restarted again in 2008 and two months later received a €115 donation from DistroWatch.

Dillo 2 was written with both C and C++ components and the Fast Light Toolkit (FLTK), and was released on October 14, 2008. Text antialiasing, support for character sets other than Latin-1, HTTP compression capability, and improved page rendering were all added. The move to FLTK from GTK+ also removed many of the project's dependencies and reduced Dillo's memory footprint by 50%.

In 2011, Dillo 3.x was released, now using FLTK 1.3. According to the changelog, this change was partly driven by the absence of an official FLTK 2 release, which had previously prevented Dillo 2 from being included in lightweight distributions where it would have otherwise been suitable.

Development stalled in 2016 due to the death of the main developer of the rendering engine, Sebastian Geerken. Arellano Cid made his last post to the development mailing list in 2019.

Dillo 3.1.x was released in 2024, after development was restarted in December 2023 by Rodrigo Arias Mallo.

== Website usurped ==
The original domain had expired in June 2022. Developers had lost access to it. Since then, the domain is used by a lookalike site, that copied the original pages and added advertisements. The site uses Wordpress, which relies on JavaScript and, thus, is incompatible with Dillo.

== Features ==
Features of Dillo include bookmarks, tabbed browsing, and support for JPEG, PNG (including alpha transparency), GIF and SVG images. Partial support for CSS was introduced in release 2.1. Settings such as the default fonts, background color, downloads folder, and home page are customizable through configuration files. Cookies are supported but disabled by default due to privacy concerns. While most web browsers retain the web cache and history after the program is closed, Dillo automatically clears them to improve both privacy and performance.

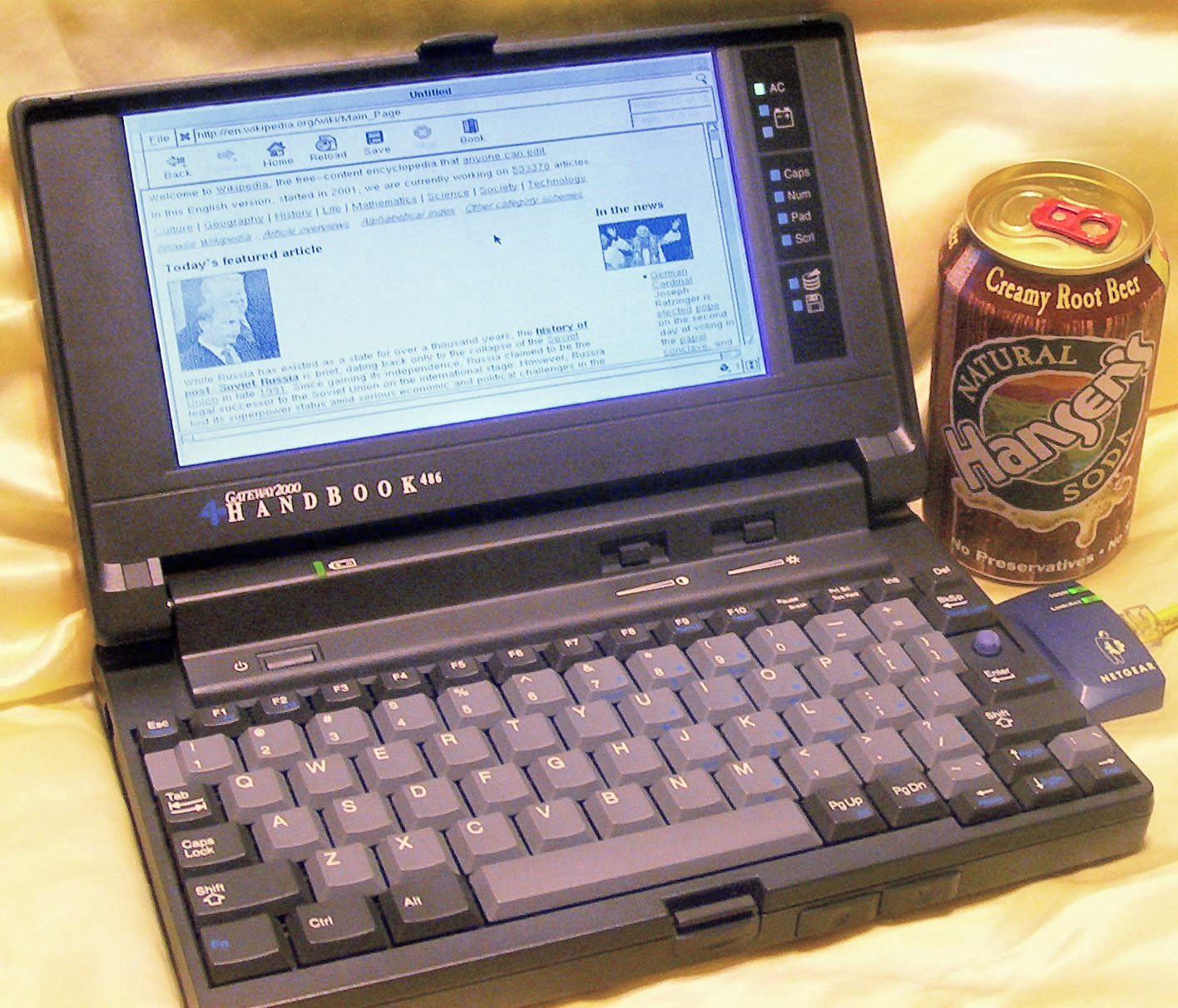
Dillo running on a i486-based Gateway HandBook subnotebook

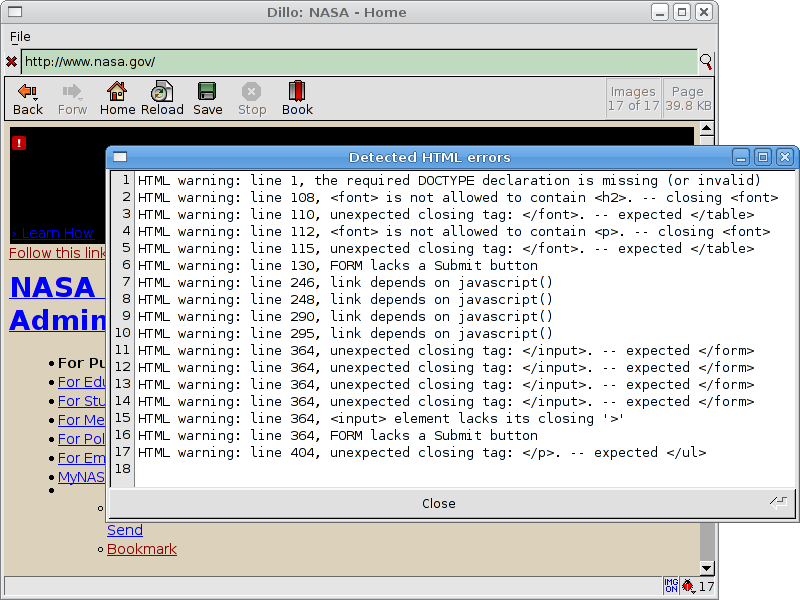
Dillo's bug meter reports errors Dillo encountered in the web page being viewed

A developer tool called the "bug meter" is provided in the lower-right corner. When clicked, it displays information about validation problems, such as unclosed tags, that Dillo found in the web page. Unlike most browsers, Dillo does not have a quirks mode to improve compatibility with web pages that use invalid HTML. Instead, Dillo processes all web pages according to the published web standards.

In 2003, two Linux enthusiasts successfully ran Dillo on an Intel 486 processor and demonstrated that even with such meager hardware, Dillo could render Home - BBC News in 10–15 seconds. Furthermore, Dillo can run on a variety of software platforms, including Linux, BSD, Solaris, macOS, MS-DOS compatible operating systems, and some handheld devices. However, Dillo's developers have made little effort to make the browser work on Microsoft Windows. Arellano Cid stated that Windows goes against Dillo's goal of democratization by artificially increasing hardware requirements and software costs. Nevertheless, Dillo has been reported to work on Windows via Cygwin.

Dillo does not support JavaScript, Java, Flash, right-to-left text, or complex text layout. Support for frames is also very limited; Dillo presents a link to each frame to allow the user to view them one at a time.

=== Forks ===
Dillo-Win32 was a project to port Dillo to Windows which is now defunct. D+ browser or Dplus continues where Dillo-Win32 left off, forked from the final Dillo-Win32 release (3.0p9), it does not attempt to maintain upstream compatibility with Dillo. The most recent version is 0.5b (Oct 15, 2013).

DilloNG is a fork hosted on GitHub which moved the code from Mercurial while adding new features like a speed dial main page, support for opening videos in an external video player and merged some previously published fixes. It was last updated in 2021.

A fork called Dillo-browser by Rodrigo Arias Mallo appeared in 2019. It stalled until 2023 when its development resumed and is ongoing as of 2024.

Dillo+ (Dillo-Plus) started in 2023 based on Dillo 3.0.5 source code found in the OpenBSD 6.8 package. It had applied numerous patches from DilloNG and added support for rendering Gopher, Gemini and markdown pages, reader mode and extended CSS support. A new Python scripting system was introduced with modules for rendering RSS, EPUB, public Telegram channel logs and zip file contents. It is still maintained as of 2024.

== Reception ==
Reviews of Dillo have praised its extraordinary speed, but noted that this speed comes at a price. The most visible cost is Dillo's inability to display complex web pages as they were meant to be. A 2008 review by Linux.com commented that Dillo's user interface may be "intimidating" for new users, and pointed out the scarcity of plug-ins for Dillo. In all, Dillo's global usage share is less than one hundredth of one percent.

Dillo is, however, the browser of choice in several space-conscious Linux distributions, such as Damn Small Linux, Feather Linux, VectorLinux, antiX and Mustang Linux.

== See also ==
- Comparison of lightweight web browsers
- Comparison of web browsers
- List of web browsers
- List of web browsers for Unix and Unix-like operating systems
