= Blink (browser engine) =

Open source browser engine

- Developer: The Chromium Project
- Release: 3 April 2013; 13 years ago
- Written in: C++
- Type: Browser engine
- License: BSD and LGPLv2.1
- Website: www.chromium.org/blink/
- Repository: chromium.googlesource.com/chromium/src/+/master/third_party/blink/

Blink is a browser engine developed as part of the free and open-source Chromium project. Blink is by far the most-used browser engine, due to the market share dominance of Google Chrome and the fact that many other browsers are based on the Chromium code.

To create Chrome, Google initially chose to use Apple's WebKit engine. However, Google needed to make substantial changes to its code to support Chrome's novel multi-process browser architecture. Over the course of several years, the divergence from Apple's version increased, so Google decided to officially fork its version as Blink in 2013.

Blink's name was influenced by two factors: the implication of speed, and a reference to the non-standard blink HTML element, popularised by Netscape Navigator, but which was never actually implemented within Blink.

By commit count, Google was the largest contributor to the WebKit project from late 2009 until the fork in 2013. One of the first changes of the new fork was to deprecate CSS vendor prefixes, including WebKit's; experimental Blink functionality is instead enabled on an opt-in basis.

== See also ==
- Comparison of browser engines
- V8, the Chromium JavaScript engine
- Chromium (web browser) § Use in app frameworks, software frameworks that use Blink by way of Chromium
