= W3m =

Command line web browser

w3m
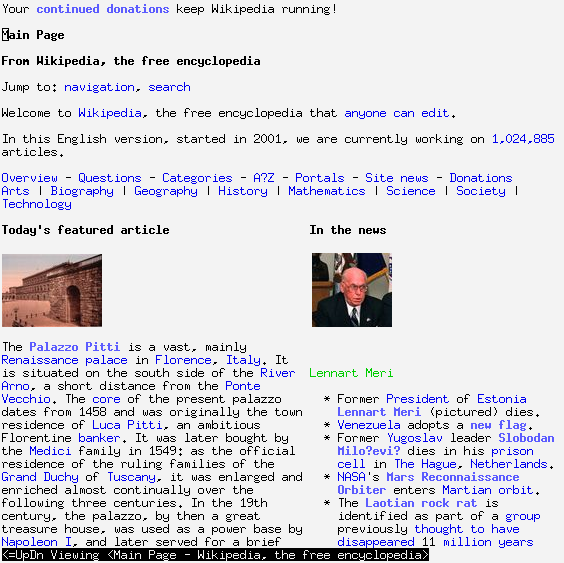
- w3m running in an xterm displaying the Wikipedia main page.
- Original author: Akinori Ito
- Developers: Fumitoshi UKAI, Tatsuya Kinoshita, Rene Kita, et al.
- Initial release: 1995
- Stable release: 0.5.6 / 23 January 2026
- Written in: C
- Operating system: OS/2, Unix & Unix-like (Solaris, SunOS, HP-UX, Linux, FreeBSD and EWS-UX (EWS-4800), Windows (with Cygwin), macOS (with Homebrew)
- Available in: English and Japanese
- Type: Web browser, Terminal pager
- License: MIT license
- Website: git.sr.ht/~rkta/w3m
- Repository: git.sr.ht/~rkta/w3m

w3m is a free and open source text-based web browser licensed under the MIT license. It differs from other early text-based browsers by supporting elements such as tables, frames, and, in some distributions, images.

== History ==
The name "w3m" stands for "WWW wo miru (WWWを見る)", which is Japanese for "to see the WWW", and where "W3" is a numeronym of "WWW". The original project is no longer active. Another developer, Tatsuya Kinoshita, maintained a fork until early 2024. Kinoshita left the project after a few months. A new fork was created as a result, which continues to be developed as of 2026.

== Functions ==
w3m runs in terminal emulator programs such as xterm and GNOME Terminal. The browser has tabbed browsing, right click menus, and image support, along with support for tables and frames. It also functions as a terminal pager. It can be navigated solely using the keyboard or with the mouse. There are two different display modes, one with colors and one that is monochrome.

w3m can be used within Emacs.

Some distributions require the installation of a second package, w3m-img, to render images using w3m.

== See also ==
- Eww (web browser)
- Emacs/W3
- Lynx (web browser)
