= Minimalism (computing) =

Minimalist philosophies in hardware and software

In computing, minimalism is the application of minimalist philosophies and principles in the design and use of hardware and software. Minimalism, in this sense, means designing systems that use the least hardware and software resources possible.

== History ==
In the late 1970s and early 1980s, programmers worked within the confines of relatively expensive and limited resources of common platforms. Eight or sixteen kilobytes of RAM was common; 64 kilobytes was considered a vast amount and was the entire address space accessible to the 8-bit CPUs predominant during the earliest generations of personal computers. The most common storage medium was the 5.25 inch floppy disk holding from 88 to 170 kilobytes. Hard drives with capacities from five to ten megabytes cost thousands of dollars.

Over time, personal-computer memory capacities expanded by orders of magnitude and mainstream programmers took advantage of the added storage to increase their software's capabilities and to make development easier by using higher-level languages. By contrast, system requirements for legacy software remained the same. As a result, even the most elaborate, feature-rich programs of yesteryear seem minimalist in comparison with current software.

One example of a program whose system requirements once gave it a heavyweight reputation is the GNU Emacs text editor, which gained the backronym "Eight Megabytes And Constantly Swapping" in an era when 8 megabytes was a lot of RAM. Today, Emacs' mainly textual buffer-based paradigm uses far fewer resources than desktop metaphor GUI IDEs with comparable features such as Eclipse or Netbeans. In a speech at the 2002 International Lisp Conference, Richard Stallman indicated that minimalism was a concern in his development of GNU and Emacs, based on his experiences with Lisp and system specifications of low-end minicomputers at the time.

As the capabilities and system requirements of common desktop software and operating systems grew throughout the 1980s and 1990s, and as software development became dominated by teams espousing conflicting, faddish software development methodologies, some developers adopted minimalism as a philosophy and chose to limit their programs to a predetermined size or scope. A focus on software optimization can result in minimalist software, as programmers reduce the number of operations their program carries out in order to speed execution.

In the early 21st century, new developments in computing have brought minimalism to the forefront. In what has been termed the post-PC era it is no longer necessary to buy a high-end personal computer merely to perform common computing tasks. Mobile computing devices, such as smartphones, tablet computers, netbooks and plug computers, often have smaller memory capacities, less-capable graphics subsystems, and slower processors when compared to the personal computer they are expected to replace. In addition, heavy use of graphics effects like alpha blending drains the battery faster than a "flat ui". The growing popularity of these devices has made minimalism an important design concern.

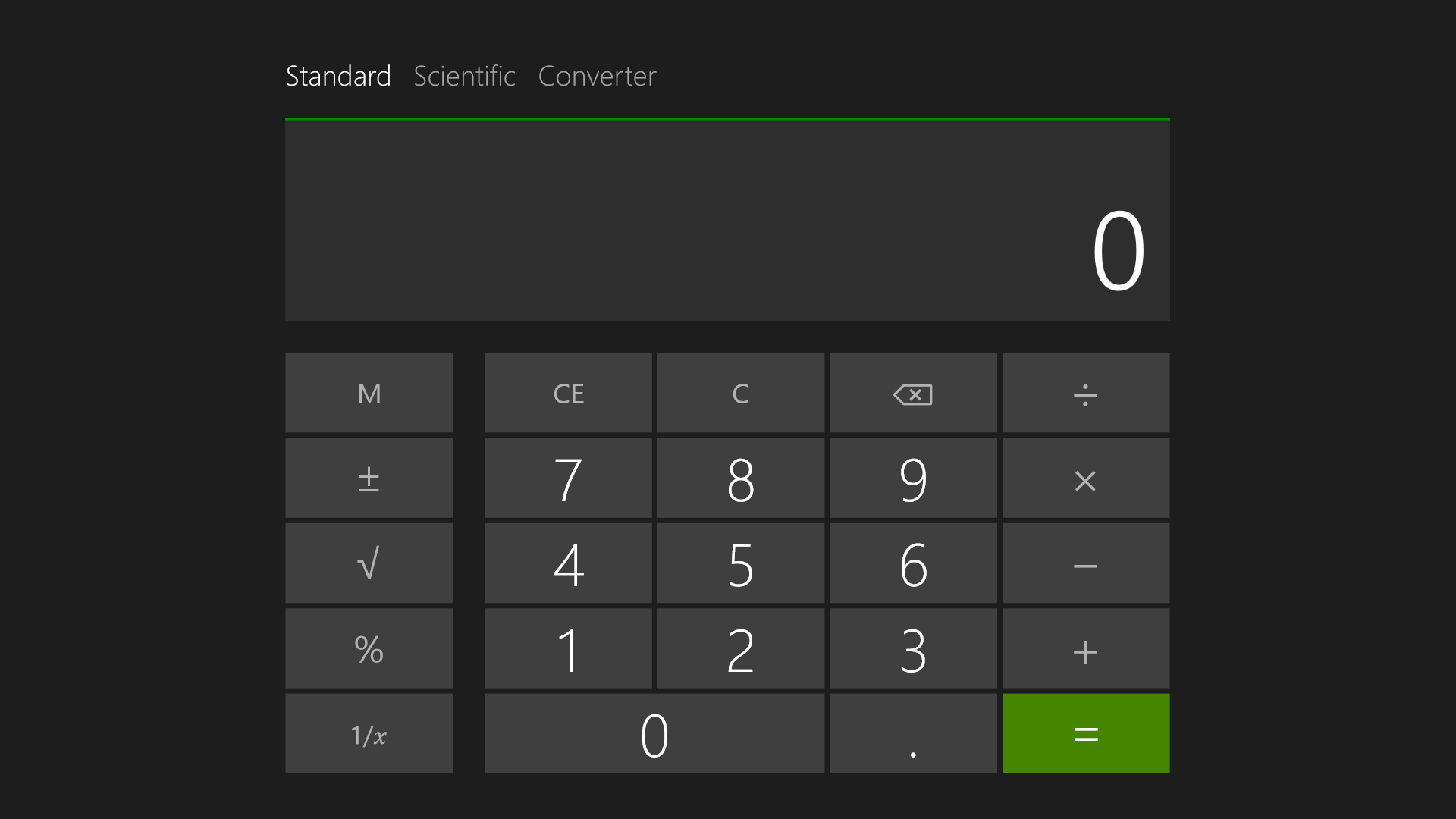
The mimimalist design of Windows Calculator in Windows 8

In Windows 8, Microsoft implemented the "simple, squared-off" Metro appearance, which was less graphics-intensive than the previous Aero interface used in Windows 7 and Windows Vista. This change was made in part because of the rise of smaller, battery-powered devices and the need to conserve power. Version 7 of Apple's iOS made similar changes for user experience reasons.

Google's Chrome browser and ChromeOS are often cited as examples of minimalist design.

== Usage ==
Developers may create user interfaces to be as simple as possible by eliminating buttons and dialog boxes that may potentially confuse the user. Minimalism is sometimes used in its visual arts meaning, particularly in the industrial design of the hardware device or software theme.

Some developers have attempted to create programs to perform a particular function in the fewest lines of code, or smallest compiled executable size possible on a given platform. Some Linux distributions mention minimalism as a goal. Alpine, Arch, Puppy, Bodhi, CrunchBang, dynebolic and Tiny Core are examples. The early development of the Unix system occurred on low-powered hardware, and Dennis Ritchie and Ken Thompson have stated their opinion that this constraint contributed to the system's "elegance of design".

Programming language designers can create minimal programming languages by eschewing syntactic sugar and extensive library functions. Such languages may be Turing tarpits due to not offering standard support for common programming tasks. Creating a minimal Lisp interpreter is a common learning task set before computer science students. The Lambda calculus, developed by Alonzo Church is a minimal programming language that uses only function definitions and function applications. Scheme, Forth, and Go are cited as examples of practical, minimal programming languages.

The programming hobby of code golf results in minimalist software, but these are typically exercises or code poetry, not usable applications software.

John Millar Carroll, in his book Minimalism Beyond the Nürnberg Funnel pointed out that the use of minimalism results in "instant-use" devices such as video games, ATMs, voting machines, and mall kiosks with little-or-no learning curve that do not require the user to read manuals. User Interface researchers have performed experiments suggesting that minimalism, as illustrated by the design principles of parsimony and transparency, bolsters efficiency and learnability. Minimalism is implicit in the Unix philosophies of "everything is a text stream" and "do one thing and do it well", although modern Unix/Linux distributions do not hold so rigorously to this philosophy.

== See also ==
- Code bloat
- Code refactoring
- Concision
- Digital hoarding
- Don't repeat yourself
- Feature creep
- GreenBrowser
- KISS principle
- Light-weight Linux distribution
- Muntzing
- Pareto principle
- Rule of least power
- Software bloat
- Unix philosophy
- Wirth's law
- Worse is better
- Zawinski's law of software envelopment
