= Table of keyboard shortcuts =

In computing, a keyboard shortcut is a sequence or combination of keystrokes on a computer keyboard which invokes commands in software.

Most keyboard shortcuts require the user to press a single key or a sequence of keys one after the other. Other keyboard shortcuts require pressing and holding several keys simultaneously (indicated in the tables below by the + sign). Keyboard shortcuts may depend on your keyboard layout.

== Comparison of keyboard shortcuts ==
- In Windows, it is possible to disable these shortcuts using the Accessibility or Ease of Access control panel.
- In GNOME, these shortcuts are possible, if Universal Access is enabled on the system.

Action	Windows	macOS	KDE Plasma	GNOME
Utility Manager	⊞ Win+U			
Use keyboard to control cursor	Left Alt+Left Shift+Numlock			
Allow user to press shortcuts one key at a time	⇧ Shift press 5 times			⇧ Shift 5 times
Hear beep when -lock key pressed	Numlock hold 5 seconds			
Stop/slow repeating characters when key is pressed	Right Shift hold 8 seconds			⇧ Shift hold for 8 seconds
Inverse (Reverse Colors) Mode	Left Alt+Left Shift+PrtScn	⌘ Cmd+⌥ Opt+Ctrl+8	Meta+⇧ Shift+i (if enabled)	
Inverse (Reverse Colors) Mode (Only current window)			Meta+⇧ Shift+u (if enabled)	
Accessibility Shortcut (Note: This can be set as Greyscale, Invert Colours, Magnifier, and more in Ease of Access settings)	Ctrl+⊞ Win+C			

Keyboard shortcuts are a common aspect of most modern operating systems and associated software applications. Their use is pervasive enough that some users consider them an important element of their routine interactions with a computer. Whether used as a matter of personal preference or for adaptive technology, the pervasiveness of common conventions means that a meaningful comparison of keyboard shortcuts can be made across various widely used operating systems.

=== General shortcuts ===
Many shortcuts (such as Ctrl+Z, Alt+E, etc.) are just common conventions and are not handled by the operating system. Whether such commands are implemented (or not) depends on how an actual application program (such as an editor) is written and the frameworks used. Not all applications/frameworks follow (all of) these conventions, so if it does not work, it is not compatible.

Some of the combinations are not true for localized versions of operating systems. For example, in a non-English version of Windows, the Edit menu is not always bound to the E shortcut.

Some software (such as KDE Plasma) allow their shortcuts to be changed, and the below list contains the defaults.

Action	Windows	macOS (Note: Highlighted shortcuts are from the list of "sacred" keybindings.)	Linux	Emacs	Vim	ChromeOS
File menu	Alt+F, or F10 then F	Ctrl+F2, then F (Note: Requires full keyboard access active: Alternatively use Ctrl+F7 to toggle this setting.)	Alt+F	Meta+`, then f	Alt+f (gvim) or Ctrl+e (vim + NERDTree)	Ctrl+O
Edit menu	Alt+E	Ctrl+F2, then E	Alt+E	Meta+`, then e	Alt+e (gvim)	
View menu	Alt+V	Ctrl+F2, then V	Alt+V			
Undo the last operation	Ctrl+Z, or Alt+← Backspace	⌘ Cmd+Z	Ctrl+Z	Ctrl+x, then u or Ctrl+/ or Ctrl+_ or Undo	u	Ctrl+Z
Redo the last operation	Ctrl+Y, or Alt+Shift+Backspace	⇧ Shift+⌘ Cmd+Z	Ctrl+⇧ Shift+Z, or Ctrl+Y	Same as undo, when undo is exhausted, it redoes. Move the cursor after one or more undos, and further undos will be redos. Since version 28, also Ctrl+? or Ctrl+Alt+_.	Ctrl+r	Ctrl+⇧ Shift+Z
Cut the selection and store it in the clipboard	Ctrl+X, or ⇧ Shift+Del	⌘ Cmd+X	Ctrl+X	Ctrl+w	x or "ax to cut in register "a" or "+x to cut in system clipboard	Ctrl+X
Copy the selection into the clipboard	Ctrl+C, or Ctrl+Ins	⌘ Cmd+C	Ctrl+C	Meta+w, or Ctrl+Ins	y or "ay or "+y	Ctrl+C
Paste contents of clipboard at cursor	Ctrl+V,or ⇧ Shift+Ins	⌘ Cmd+V	Ctrl+V	Ctrl+y, or ⇧ Shift+Ins	p or "ap to paste the content of the "a" register or "+p to paste the content of the system clipboard	Ctrl+V
Paste special	⊞ Win+V	Shift+Opt+Cmd+V	Ctrl+⇧ Shift+V	Meta+y	Ctrl+⇧ Shift+V	Search+V
Clipboard History	⊞ Win+V					
Select all in focused control or window	Ctrl+A	⌘ Cmd+A	Ctrl+A	Ctrl+x, then h	ggVG, unlikely ever needed as most commands take an optional range parameter. % means "all in focused windows" here so e.g. to copy all the text, use :%y	Ctrl+A
Cycle through installed keyboard languages / input methods	Alt+⇧ Shift, Ctrl+⇧ Shift, ⊞ Win+Space, ⊞ Win+⇧ Shift+Space (Note: Alt+⇧ Shift changes between languages while Ctrl+⇧ Shift changes between keyboard layouts of the same language. The latter two display a menu with the currently selected input method highlighted, and debuted in Windows 8. ⊞ Win+⇧ Shift+Space goes through the list backwards. For the first two shortcuts going backwards is done by using the right ⇧ Shift key instead of the left.)	Fn or ⌘ Cmd+Space on older devices (not MBR) Configure desired keypress in Keyboard and Mouse Preferences, Keyboard Shortcuts, Select the next source in Input menu.	Ctrl+Alt+K via KDE Keyboard Alt+⇧ Shift in GNOME	Ctrl+\		Ctrl+Space
Print	Ctrl+P	⌘ Cmd+P	Ctrl+P			Ctrl+P
Open Help Menu			F1 in GNOME			Ctrl+Search+S
Windows Mobility Center	Windows 7: ⊞ Win+X Windows 10: ⊞ Win+X then B					
PowerUser (WinX) Menu	Windows 10: ⊞ Win+X					
Restart Video Driver	Windows 10: Ctrl+⇧ Shift+⊞ Win+B					

==== System navigation ====
Action	Windows	macOS	Linux	ChromeOS
Lock desktop	⊞ Win+L	Ctrl+⌘ Cmd+Q (macOS High Sierra and greater) or Ctrl+⇧ Shift+Eject or MBR Ctrl+⇧ Shift+Pwr (If "Require password after sleep or screen saver" is enabled in "System Preferences — Security & Privacy")	Super+L (GNOME) or Ctrl+Alt+L	Search+L
Log out user		⇧ Shift+⌘ Cmd+Q	Ctrl+Alt+Delete	Ctrl+⇧ Shift+Q (Twice)
Switch active user	⊞ Win+L (Note: Takes you to the "Switch User" screen when Fast User Switching has been enabled (enabled by default in XP).)			
Applications menu	⊞ Win or Ctrl+Esc	Ctrl+F2, then "n"	Super or Ctrl+Esc	Search
Run application	⊞ Win, enter executable name or ⊞ Win+R, enter executable name	⌘ Cmd+Space, enter executable name or ⌘ Cmd+↓	Alt+F2, enter executable name	
Search	⊞ Win, enter executable name, ⊞ Win+S, or F3, or Ctrl+F	⌘ Cmd+Space	⊞ Win (Gnome)	Search
Show desktop	⊞ Win+D	Fn+H or F11	Ctrl+Alt+D	
Access SysTray	⊞ Win+B			⇧ Shift+Alt+S
Switch window (next/previous)	Alt+Tab ↹ / ⇧ Shift+Alt+Tab ↹	⌘ Cmd+Tab ↹ / ⌘ Cmd+⇧ Shift+Tab ↹ (While in app switching window, ⌘ Cmd+` can be used to select backward, ⌘ Cmd+1 can be used to view selected app's windows)	Alt+Tab ↹ / Alt+⇧ Shift+Tab ↹ or Alt+Tab ↹ / Alt+⇧ Shift+Tab ↹ to switch windows within the same application (Gnome)	Hold Alt, then quickly press Tab ↹
Switch window without dialog (next/previous)	Alt+Esc / ⇧ Shift+Alt+Esc	Only works within single Applications ⌘ Cmd+` / ⌘ Cmd+⇧ Shift+`		
Task manager	Ctrl+⇧ Shift+Esc, Ctrl+Alt+Delete (Note: Shows task manager in Windows XP if the welcome screen is enabled. Otherwise displays an NT-style menu, with the option of launching the task manager; likewise for Vista.)	⌥ Opt+⌘ Cmd+Esc (summons "Force Quit Applications" window)		Search+Esc
File manager	⊞ Win+E		Super+F	⇧ Shift+Alt+M
New folder	Ctrl+⇧ Shift+N	⇧ Shift+⌘ Cmd+N	Ctrl+⇧ Shift+N	Ctrl+E
Rename object	F2	↵ Enter (Note: On Mac OS, OS X, and macOS, the key commonly called ↵ Enter is properly called ↩ Return, while ⌅ Enter is a separate key normally located on the numeric keypad or invoked as ⌥ Opt+↩ Return (mainly on keyboards without a numeric keypad).) or F2	F2	Ctrl+↵ Enter
Show hidden files	Alt+V, then H, then H again, while in File Explorer, will toggle setting	⇧ Shift+⌘ Cmd+., while in Finder, will toggle setting	Ctrl+H, Alt+. in KDE Plasma	Ctrl+.

==== Power management ====
Action	Windows	macOS	Linux	ChromeOS
Place computer into sleep/standby mode	Windows 10: ⊞ Win+x > u > s Windows 7: ⊞ Win+→+→+↵ Enter Sleep (available on some keyboards)	⌥ Opt+⌘ Cmd+Eject	Sleep (available on some keyboards, configurable in Control Panel ➢ Power Options ➢ Advanced tab dialog box)	
Shut down computer	Windows 10: ⊞ Win+x > u > u	Ctrl+⌥ Opt+⌘ Cmd+Eject (no confirmation, shutdown is immediate)	Ctrl+Alt+⇧ Shift+PageDown (KDE Plasma; no confirmation, shutdown is immediate) (GNOME; there is no default shortcut)	Power (Hold for 10 seconds)
Restart computer	Windows 10: ⊞ Win+x > u > r Windows 7: ⊞ Win+→+→+↑+↵ Enter	Ctrl+⌘ Cmd+Eject or Ctrl+⌘ Cmd+Power (no confirmation, restart is immediate)	Ctrl+Alt+⇧ Shift+PageUp (KDE Plasma; no confirmation, restart is immediate)	
Place display in sleep mode		Ctrl+⇧ Shift+Eject		where is lined
Bring up power/sleep dialog box		Ctrl+Eject		
Force shutdown	Power (Hold for several seconds)	⌥ Opt+⌘ Cmd+Eject or Hold Power for 10 seconds		refresh+power

==== Screenshots ====
Action	Windows	macOS	Linux	ChromeOS
Save screenshot of entire screen as file	⊞ Win+Print Screen	⇧ Shift+⌘ Cmd+3	Print Screen	Ctrl+Show Windows
Copy screenshot of entire screen to clipboard	⊞ Win+Print Screen or Print Screen	Ctrl+⇧ Shift+⌘ Cmd+3	Ctrl+Print Screen	Ctrl+Show Windows
Copy screenshot of active window to clipboard	Alt+Print Screen		Ctrl+Alt+Print Screen	
Save screenshot of window as file		⇧ Shift+⌘ Cmd+4 then Space then move mouse and click	Alt+Print Screen (GNOME)	Ctrl+Alt+Show Windows then move mouse and click
Copy screenshot of window to clipboard		Ctrl+⇧ Shift+⌘ Cmd+4 then Space then move mouse and click	Alt+Print Screen (GNOME)	Ctrl+Alt+Show Windows then move mouse and click
Save screenshot of arbitrary area as file		⇧ Shift+⌘ Cmd+4 then click+drag mouse over required area	Print Screen click+drag mouse over required area, then ↵ Enter (GNOME)	Ctrl+⇧ Shift+Show Windows then click+drag mouse over required area
Copy screenshot of arbitrary area to clipboard (Snip)	Windows 10: ⊞ Win+⇧ Shift+S	Ctrl+⇧ Shift+⌘ Cmd+4 then click+drag mouse over required area	Print Screen click+drag mouse over required area, then ↵ Enter (GNOME)	Ctrl+⇧ Shift+Show Windows then click+drag mouse over required area
Screencasting			Ctrl+Alt+⇧ Shift+R (GNOME)	Ctrl+⇧ Shift+Show Windows then select the Screen Record button on the toolbar
Screenshot Utility		⇧ Shift+⌘ Cmd+5	Print Screen	Ctrl+⇧ Shift+Show Windows
Save screenshot of the Touch Bar as file		⇧ Shift+⌘ Cmd+6		

=== Text editing ===
Many of these commands may be combined with ⇧ Shift to select a region of text. (Note: For the concept of "selected text" see also X Window selection)

In macOS, holding ⌘ Command while dragging mouse can be used to invert selection, and holding ⌥ Option can be used to select by rectangular area in some apps. (These two functionalities may be combined).

In macOS, the default text editing keyboard shortcuts in Cocoa text views can be overridden and new custom shortcuts can be created, by creating and editing related configuration files. (Note: A full list of all default Cocoa textview key bindings can be dumped by executing this command in Terminal.app: plutil -p /System/Library/Frameworks/AppKit.framework/Resources/StandardKeyBinding.dict)

Action	Windows	macOS	Linux	Emacs	Vim	ChromeOS
Delete char to the right of cursor	Del or Fn+← Backspace	Del or Fn+← Backspace or Ctrl+D	Del	Ctrl+d	x	Alt+← Backspace or Search+← Backspace or Del
Delete word to the right of cursor	Ctrl+Del	⌥ Opt+Del or ⌥ Opt+Fn+← Backspace	Ctrl+Del	Meta+d	dw (delete space too) or de (keep space)	Ctrl+Search+← Backspace
Delete word to the left of cursor	Ctrl+← Backspace	⌥ Opt+← Backspace	Ctrl+← Backspace	Ctrl+← Backspace or Meta+← Backspace	dge (delete space too) or db (keep space)	Ctrl+← Backspace
Go to start of line	Home or Fn+←	⌘ Cmd+← (go to start of line) or Ctrl+A (go to start of paragraph)	Home	Ctrl+a or Home	^ (go to first non-space) or 0 (go to column 0)	Search+←
Go to end of line	End or Fn+→	⌘ Cmd+→ (go to end of line) or Ctrl+E (go to end of paragraph)	End	Ctrl+e or End	$	Search+→
Go to start of document	Ctrl+Home	⌘ Cmd+↑	Ctrl+Home	Meta+< or Ctrl+Home	gg	Ctrl+Search+←
Go to end of document	Ctrl+End	⌘ Cmd+↓	Ctrl+End	Meta+> or Ctrl+End	G	Ctrl+Search+→
Go to previous word	Ctrl+← or Ctrl+/	⌥ Opt+← or Ctrl+⌥ Opt+B	Ctrl+←	Meta+b or Ctrl+← or Meta+←	b or ge	Ctrl+←
Go to next word	Ctrl+→	⌥ Opt+→ or Ctrl+⌥ Opt+F	Ctrl+→	Meta+f or Ctrl+→ or Meta+→	w or e	Ctrl+→
Go to previous line	↑	↑ or Ctrl+p	↑	Ctrl+p or ↑	k or ↑	↑
Go to next line	↓	↓ or Ctrl+n	↓	Ctrl+n or ↓	j or ↓	↓
Go to previous line break (paragraph)	Ctrl+↑	⌥ Opt+↑	Ctrl+↑ (kword or GNOME)	Meta+( or Control+↑	(	Ctrl+↑
Go to next line break	Ctrl+↓	⌥ Opt+↓	Ctrl+↓ (kword or GNOME)	Meta+} or Control+↓	)	Ctrl+↓
Move the cursor down the length of the viewport	Page Down	⌥ Opt+PageDn or ⌥ Opt+Fn+↓ or Ctrl+V	Page Down	Ctrl+v or Page Down	Ctrl+f or Page Down	Search+↓
Move the cursor up the length of the viewport	Page Up	⌥ Opt+PageUp or ⌥ Opt+Fn+↑	Page Up	Meta+v or Page Up	Ctrl+b or Page Up	Search+↑
Find	Ctrl+F	⌘ Cmd+F or ⌘ Cmd+E (search with current selection)	Ctrl+F Ctrl+K (GNOME; interactive search)	Ctrl+s	/	Ctrl+F
Go to next search result	F3	⌘ Cmd+G	Ctrl+G (GNOME) or F3 (KDE)	Ctrl+s	n	Ctrl+G or ↵ Enter
Go to previous search result	⇧ Shift+F3	⇧ Shift+⌘ Cmd+G	Ctrl+⇧ Shift+G (GNOME) or ⇧ Shift+F3 (KDE)	Ctrl+r	N	Ctrl+⇧ Shift+G or ⇧ Shift+↵ Enter
Search and replace	Ctrl+H	⌘ Cmd+F	Ctrl+H (GNOME) or Ctrl+R (KDE)	Meta+%	%s/fosh/fish/gc (Note: In whole document (%), substitute (s) fosh by fish, don't stop at one substitution per line (g) and ask for confirmation for each substitution (c).)	Ctrl+⇧ Shift+H
Search with a regular expression				Ctrl+Meta+s	All searches use regular expressions.	
Search and replace with a regular expression				Ctrl+Meta+%	All searches use regular expressions.	
Emoji Picker	⊞ Win+. or ⊞ Win+;	Ctrl+⌘ Cmd+Space				Search+⇧ Shift+Space

==== Text formatting ====
Action	Windows WordPad	macOS	Linux	Emacs	Vim
Bold	Ctrl+B	⌘ Cmd+B	Ctrl+B	Meta+o, then b	
Underline	Ctrl+U	⌘ Cmd+U	Ctrl+U	Meta+o, then u	
Italic	Ctrl+I	⌘ Cmd+I	Ctrl+I	Meta+o, then i	
Uppercase / Lowercase	Ctrl+⇧ Shift+A	⌥ Opt+⌘ Cmd+C	⇧ Shift+F3	Meta+u for upper, Meta+l for lower, Meta+c for capitalized.	gU for upper, gu for lower, ~ to toggle.
Superscript	Ctrl+⇧ Shift+=	Ctrl+⌘ Cmd++ (some applications only)	Ctrl+⇧ Shift+P		
Subscript	Ctrl+=	Ctrl+⌘ Cmd+- (some applications only)	Ctrl+⇧ Shift+B		
Selected text larger/smaller	Ctrl+>, Ctrl+< or Ctrl+[, Ctrl/core+] or Ctrl+⇧ Shift+>, Ctrl+⇧ Shift+<	⌘ Cmd++ ⌘ Cmd+-			
Selected text Bullets or Numbered Items	Ctrl+⇧ Shift+L				
Insert Linebreak/Newline	Ctrl+↵ Enter	⇧ Shift+↵ Enter or Ctrl+↵ Enter or ⌥ Opt+↵ Enter (may be able to skip some editor-defined input processing)	Ctrl+↵ Enter		
Insert Unicode	Alt+X + character codepoint	⌥ Opt + character codepoint ("Unicode Hex Input" must be added and active as current input source)	Ctrl+⇧ Shift+U + character codepoint	Ctrl+v+u + character codepoint	Ctrl+X+8 + character codepoint

=== Browsers / Go menu ===
Action	Windows	macOS	Linux	ChromeOS
Go to Address Bar	Ctrl+L / F6 / Alt+D, Alt+C or Alt+E depending on language	⌘ Cmd+L or ⇧ Shift+⌘ Cmd+G	Ctrl+L or Alt+D or F6	Ctrl+L or Alt+D
Go to the previous location in history	Alt+← or ← Backspace	⌘ Cmd+[ or ⌘ Cmd+←	Alt+←	Alt+←
Go to the next location in history	Alt+→ or ⇧ Shift+← Backspace (web browser only)	⌘ Cmd+] or ⌘ Cmd+→	Alt+→	Alt+→
Go up one level in the navigation hierarchy	Alt+↑ (Vista, 7, 8, or 10 only) or ← Backspace (Windows Explorer)	⌘ Cmd+↑	Alt+↑	
Go to the starting page defined by the user or application	Alt+Home	⌘ Cmd+Home	Ctrl+Home (KDE) / Alt+Home (GNOME)	Alt+Search+←

==== Web browsers ====
Action	Windows	macOS	Linux	Emacs-w3m	Vimperator	ChromeOS
Bookmarks menu	Ctrl+B	⌘ Cmd+B (Firefox)	Alt+B	v	:bmarks	Ctrl+⇧ Shift+B
URL Shortcuts (Adds www. + .com)	Ctrl+↵ Enter	⌘ Cmd+↵ Enter (Firefox) or Ctrl+↵ Enter (Chrome)	Ctrl+↵ Enter			Ctrl+↵ Enter
URL Shortcuts (Adds www. + .org)		⇧ Shift+⌘ Cmd+↵ Enter (Firefox)	Ctrl+⇧ Shift+↵ Enter			
URL Shortcuts (Adds www. + .net)		⇧ Shift+↵ Enter (Firefox)	⇧ Shift+↵ Enter			
Add bookmark for current page	Ctrl+D	⌘ Cmd+D	Ctrl+B / Ctrl+D	a	:bmark	Ctrl+D
Add bookmark for current link				Meta+a		
Manage bookmarks	Ctrl+⇧ Shift+O (MS Edge/Chrome/Firefox) or Ctrl+B (Internet Explorer)	⌘ Cmd+⌥ Opt+B (Chrome/Safari) or ⌘ Cmd+⇧ Shift+B (Firefox)	Ctrl+⇧ Shift+R / Ctrl+B			Ctrl+⇧ Shift+O
Move focus to Web search bar	Ctrl+E	⌘ Cmd+E (Opera) or ⌘ Cmd+K (Firefox) or ⌥ Opt+⌘ Cmd+F (Safari/Chrome)	Ctrl+k		t (open in a new tab) or T (open in current tab)	Ctrl+E or Ctrl+K
Move focus to address bar	Ctrl+L or F6 or Alt+D	⌘ Cmd+L	Ctrl+L or Alt+D or F6	g	O to alter URL, use y to copy it.	Ctrl+L or Alt+D
Refresh a webpage	F5 or Ctrl+R	⌘ Cmd+R	F5 or Ctrl+R	R	r	⟲ or Ctrl+R
Open developer tools	F12 or Ctrl+⇧ Shift+I	⌘ Cmd+⌥ Opt+I	F12 or Ctrl+⇧ Shift+I			Ctrl+⇧ Shift+I
Refresh a webpage ignoring cache	Ctrl+F5 or Ctrl+⇧ Shift+R	⌥ Opt+⌘ Cmd+E then ⌘ Cmd+R	Ctrl+⇧ Shift+F5 or Ctrl+⇧ Shift+R		R	Ctrl+⇧ Shift+R
Open a new window	Ctrl+N	⌘ Cmd+N (Chrome, hold shift to open new window in Incognito)	Ctrl+N		:winopen	Ctrl+N
Zoom Options (zoom in / zoom out / zoom 100%)	Ctrl++ / Ctrl+- / Ctrl+0	⌘ Cmd++ / ⌘ Cmd+- / ⌘ Cmd+0	Ctrl++ / Ctrl+- / Ctrl+0		zi / zo / zz (text only) or zI / zO / zZ (text and images)	Ctrl++ / Ctrl+- / Ctrl+0

==== Tab management ====
Action	Windows	macOS	Linux	Emacs-w3m	Vimperator	ChromeOS
New tab	Ctrl+T	⌘ Cmd+T	Ctrl+⇧ Shift+N or Ctrl+⇧ Shift+T or Ctrl+T	Ctrl+c, then Ctrl+t	t	Ctrl+T
Close tab	Ctrl+W or Ctrl+F4	⌘ Cmd+W	Ctrl+W Firefox & Opera & Chrome & GNOME Web & Midori Ctrl+F4 Firefox & Opera & Chrome		d	Ctrl+W
Close all tabs but the current one		⌘ Cmd+⌥ Opt+T (Safari)		Ctrl+c, then Meta+w		
Go to next tab	Ctrl+Tab ↹	Ctrl+Tab ↹ or ⌘ Cmd+⇧ Shift+→ (Safari)	Ctrl+PageDown or Ctrl+Tab ↹ or Ctrl+.	Ctrl+c, then Ctrl+n	gt	Ctrl+Tab ↹
Go to previous tab	Ctrl+⇧ Shift+Tab ↹	Ctrl+⇧ Shift+Tab ↹ or ⌘ Cmd+⇧ Shift+← (Safari)	Ctrl+PageUp or Ctrl+⇧ Shift+Tab ↹ or Ctrl+,	Ctrl+c, then Ctrl+p	gT	Ctrl+⇧ Shift+Tab ↹
Go to tab-n (Note: n is a number between 1 and 8.)	Ctrl+n (MS Edge, Chrome, Firefox, Internet Explorer)	⌘ Cmd+n (Chrome)	Alt+n (Chrome, Firefox) or Ctrl+n (Chrome)		First tab: g0 Last tab: g$	Ctrl+b
Go to last tab	Ctrl+9 (Chrome, Firefox, Internet Explorer)	⌘ Cmd+9 (Chrome)	Alt+9 (Chrome, Firefox) or Ctrl+9 (Chrome)		First tab: g0 Last tab: g$	Ctrl+b
Move a tab to the left (Note: Holding the keyboard shortcut will move the selected tab past multiple tabs to the left/right.)	Ctrl+⇧ Shift+Page Up (MS Edge,Chrome, Firefox)	Ctrl+⇧ Shift+Page Up (Chrome)				
Move a tab to the right	Ctrl+⇧ Shift+Page Down (MS Edge,Chrome, Firefox)	Ctrl+⇧ Shift+Page Down (Chrome)				
Open a previously closed tab	Ctrl+⇧ Shift+T	⌘ Cmd+⇧ Shift+T (Firefox, Opera, Chrome)	Ctrl+⇧ Shift+T (Firefox, Opera, Chrome)	Ctrl+⇧ Shift+T (Firefox)	u	Ctrl+⇧ Shift+T
Open a previously closed window	Ctrl+⇧ Shift+N (Firefox)					Ctrl+⇧ Shift+T

=== Window management ===
Action	Windows	macOS	KDE Plasma	GNOME	Emacs	ChromeOS
Force window mode (Application requires functionality for set action)	Alt+↵ Enter	⌥ Option+Alt+↵ Enter or ⌥ Option+Alt+F or ⌘ Cmd+F or ⌘ Cmd+⌥ Option+F				
Pop up window menu	Alt+Space		Alt+F3	Alt+Space	Meta+`, then b	
Close the focused window	Alt+F4 or Alt+Space then C (Note: In Microsoft Windows, all shortcuts with Alt+Space followed by another key are language dependent. The Alt+Space combination opens the window menu, and the following key selects from the menu. As the menu labels (and their underlined hotkeys) vary with the Windows system language, the hotkeys are different for international versions of Microsoft Windows, and may change if users change their Windows system language preference. The given examples are valid for English user preferences/version of Windows.)	⌘ Cmd+W	Alt+F4	Alt+F4 or Ctrl+W	Ctrl+x, then k	Ctrl+W
Close all windows of current application		⌘ Cmd+⌥ Option+W				Ctrl+⇧ Shift+W
Restore the focused window to its previous size	Alt+Space then R		Alt+F3 then X	Alt+F5	Ctrl+x, then r, then j, then letter of the window state register.	
Move the focused window	Alt+Space then M then Arrow Keys. Press ↵ Enter to save new location and Esc to cancel		Alt+Mouse / Alt+F3 then M then Arrow Keys	Alt+Mouse / Alt+F7 then Arrow Keys		
Resize the focused window	Alt+Space then S then Arrow Keys. ↵ Enter to save new size and Esc to cancel		Alt+F3 then S then Arrow Keys	Alt+F8 then Arrow Keys / Alt+Right Mouse Button (Note: Needs to be activated first on some distributions.)	Ctrl+x, then ^ vertically	Alt+] (snap window to right half of screen), Alt+[ (snap window to left half of screen)
Keep window always on top	Ctrl+Alt+Esc (toggles on/off)					
Hide the focused window		⌘ Cmd+H (Hides all windows of the currently active application)			Meta+x, then bury-buffer, then ↵ Enter	
Hide all except the focused window		⌘ Cmd+⌥ Option+H				
Put the focused window furthest back (in tab order and Z axis)	Alt+Esc					
Minimize the focused window	Alt+Space then N or ⊞ Win+↓ (Windows Vista Home Premium, Windows 7+)	⌘ Cmd+M	Alt+F3 then N	Alt+F9	Meta+x, then bury-buffer, then ↵ Enter	Alt+-
Maximize the focused window	Alt+Space then X or ⊞ Win+↑ (Windows 7+)	⌘ Cmd+L	Alt+F3 then X	Alt+F10	Ctrl+x, then 1	Alt
Maximize horizontally			Available, but no default	Available, but no default		
Maximize vertically	⊞ Win+⇧ Shift+↑ (Windows 7+)	Available ('Zoom'), but no default	Available, but no default	Available, but no default		
Minimize all	⊞ Win+M (minimize all windows) or ⊞ Win+D (show desktop)	⌘ Cmd+⌥ Option+M	Available, but no default			
Minimize all non focused windows	⊞ Win+Home (Windows 7+)		Available, but no default			
Undo minimize all	⊞ Win+⇧ Shift+M		Available, but no default			
Switch fullscreen/normal size	F11 or ⊞ Win+⇧ Shift+↵ Enter (UWP apps only)	⌘ Cmd+Ctrl+F or Fn+F	F11	F11		Fullscreen
Show the window in full screen mode, with no border, menubar, toolbar, or statusbar		Depends on application, system default: ⌘ Cmd+Ctrl+F and Fn+F	Ctrl+⇧ Shift+F	Ctrl+F11		
Show all open windows	⊞ Win+Tab ↹	F3 or F9 or Fn+F9 or Move mouse pointer to configured hot corner or active screen corner		⊞ Win works per desktop on Gnome 3+	Ctrl+x, then Ctrl+b	Show Windows
Show all windows of current application	⊞ Win+Tab ↹	Ctrl+F3 or F10 or Move mouse pointer to configured hot corner or active screen corner		Ctrl+`	Ctrl+x, then Ctrl+b	
Show all workspaces	⊞ Win+Tab ↹ (Windows 10)	F8 or Move mouse pointer to configured hot corner or active screen corner		⊞ Win		Show Windows
Move window to left/right/up/down workspace	⊞ Win+←/→ (Windows 7+)		Available, but no default	Ctrl+Alt+⇧ Shift+← / →		⇧ Shift+Search+[/]
Move window between multiple monitors	⊞ Win+⇧ Shift+←/→ (Windows 7+)			⊞ Win+⇧ Shift+←/→/⊞ Win+⇧ Shift+↑/↓		Alt+Search+M
Move window to workspace n			Available, but no default			
Switch to previous/next workspace	⊞ Win+Ctrl+←/→		Available, but no default			
Go to workspace n		Ctrl+n	Ctrl+Fn			⇧ Shift+Search+n
Go to left/right/up/down workspace	(Note: The WinSplit window manager application for Windows knows to emulate this behaviour.)	Ctrl+← / Ctrl+→ / Ctrl+↑ / Ctrl+↓ (OS X 10.5 to 10.6), Ctrl+← / Ctrl+→ (OS X 10.7 and later)	Available, but no default	Ctrl+Alt+← / →		Search+[/]
Quit application of current window	Alt+F4 or Ctrl+F4 varies (Note: There is no single consistent shortcut for closing a document or quitting an application in Windows XP. In many multiple document interface applications, Ctrl+W or Ctrl+F4 closes a document and Alt+F4 quits. In other applications where each document is in its own window, such as later versions of Microsoft Word, Ctrl+W, Ctrl+F4, and Alt+F4 close a document, and there is no consistent shortcut for quitting an application.)	⌘ Cmd+Q (Note: macOS uses ⌘ Cmd+W Close (window), ⌘ Cmd+Q Quit (application), and ⌘ Cmd+⌥ Opt+Esc Force Quit (application); ⌥ Option+F4 can be used to quit certain services or applications. Quit is closest to Kill.)	Ctrl+Alt+Esc	Ctrl+Q or Alt+F4	q	Ctrl+⇧ Shift+W
Close dialog	Esc (Laptop) ⊞ Win+↓+F4 (Desktop)	Esc or sometimes ⌘ Cmd+.		Esc		Esc or Ctrl+⇧ Shift+W
Open/Focus (preview) pinned program on the taskbar	⊞ Win+(#) where "#" is the position of the program on the Windows Taskbar (Windows 7+)			⊞ Win+(#) where "#" is the position of the program on the GNOME Dash		Alt+(#) where "#" is the position of the program on the Shelf
Open new program window of pinned program in Quick Launch	⊞ Win+(#) where "#" is the position of the program on the Quick Launch toolbar (Windows Vista, 7+)	⌘ Cmd+A+⇧ Shift				Alt+(#) where "#" is the position of the program on the Shelf
Open new program window of the pinned program on the taskbar (if program is already opened)	⊞ Win+⇧ Shift+(#) where "#" is the position of the program on the Windows Taskbar (Windows 7+)			⊞ Win+Ctrl+(#) where "#" is the position of the program on the GNOME Dash		Alt+(#) where "#" is the position of the program on the Shelf
Focus the first taskbar entry; pressing again will cycle through them	⊞ Win+T, then ←→ back and forth; hold ⇧ Shift to cycle backwards (Windows 7+)					
Peek at the desktop	⊞ Win+Space (Windows 7) ⊞ Win+Comma (Windows 8+)	⌘ Cmd+F3 or F11 or Move mouse pointer to configured hot corner or active screen corner				
Bring gadgets to the front of the Z-order and cycle between gadgets	⊞ Win+G (Windows Vista,7) or ⊞ Win+Space (Vista only, no cycling)					
External display options (mirror, extend desktop, etc.)	⊞ Win+P (Windows 7+)					Ctrl+Fullscreen

=== User interface navigation (widgets and controls) ===
Action	Windows	macOS	KDE	GNOME
Moves keyboard focus to next/previous control	Tab ↹ / ⇧ Shift+Tab ↹	Tab ↹ / ⇧ Shift+Tab ↹	Tab ↹ / ⇧ Shift+Tab ↹	Tab ↹ / ⇧ Shift+Tab ↹ Ctrl+Tab ↹ / Ctrl+⇧ Shift+Tab ↹
Pop up tooltip for currently focused control	⇧ Shift+F1			Ctrl+F1
Show context-sensitive help for currently focused window or control	⇧ Shift+F1	⌘ Cmd+? (Not context-sensitive, functionally a "Spotlight" for menu bar items and help topics)	⇧ Shift+F1	⇧ Shift+F1
Give focus to next/previous pane	Ctrl+F6 / Alt+F5	Ctrl+Tab ↹ Ctrl+⇧ Shift+Tab ↹		F5 / Alt+F6
Give focus to splitter bar in paned window				F8
Give focus to window's menu bar	F10 or Alt	Fn+M or Ctrl+F2 (or Fn+Ctrl+F2 on some keyboards)	Alt	F10
Pop up contextual menu for currently selected objects (aka context menu)	⇧ Shift+F10 or ≣ Menu	Varies with laptop / extended keyboard type; enable Mouse keys in Universal Access, then Fn+Ctrl+5 or Ctrl+5 (numeric keypad) or Function+Ctrl+I (laptop)	≣ Menu	≣ Menu or ⇧ Shift+F10
Toggle selected state of focused checkbox, radio button, or toggle button	Space	Space	Space	Space
Activate focused button, menu item etc.	↵ Enter	Space (also ↵ Enter for menu items)	↵ Enter	↵ Enter
Expand a drop-down list	F4 or Alt+↓			
Select/move to first/last item in selected widget			Home / End	Home / End
Scroll selected view by one page up/left/down/right		PageUp / PageDown ( Fn+↑ / Fn+↓ )		PageUp / Ctrl+PageUp / PageDown / Ctrl+PageDown
Scroll selected view to top/bottom		Home / End ( Fn+← / Fn+→ )		
Switch focus to the next/previous tab/view within a window	Ctrl+Tab ↹	Ctrl+Tab ↹ Ctrl+⇧ Shift+Tab ↹		Ctrl+Tab ↹ -> Ctrl+⇧ Shift+Tab ↹ <-
Switch focus to the next/previous panel on the desktop				Ctrl+Alt+Tab ↹ / Ctrl+Alt+⇧ Shift+Tab ↹
Switch focus to the next/previous panel (without dialog)				Ctrl+Alt+Esc / Ctrl+Alt+⇧ Shift+Esc

=== Command line shortcuts ===
Below is a list of common keyboard shortcuts that are used in a command line environment. Bash and Z shell keybindings are derived from Emacs text editing bindings.

Action	Windows (cmd.exe)	Windows (PowerShell)	Unix-like (bash, zsh)	Unix-like (POSIX-compliant shell)
Scroll through history of typed commands	↑/↓	↑/↓	↑/↓ or Ctrl+P/Ctrl+N	ESC K / ESC J
Signal end-of-file	Ctrl+Z		Ctrl+D	
Abort current command/typing	Ctrl+C	Ctrl+C	Ctrl+C	Ctrl+C
Erase word to the left	Ctrl+← Backspace	Ctrl+← Backspace	Ctrl+W or Esc+← Backspace	
Erase word to the right	Ctrl+Delete	Ctrl+Delete	Alt+D	
Erase line to the left	Ctrl+Home	Ctrl+Home	Ctrl+U	
Erase line to the right	Ctrl+End	Ctrl+End	Ctrl+K	
Yank/paste previously erased string			Ctrl+Y	
Move one word to the left (backward)	Ctrl+←	Ctrl+←	Alt+B	
Move one word to the right (forward)	Ctrl+→	Ctrl+→	Alt+F	
Move to beginning of line	Home	Home	Ctrl+A or Home	
Move to end of line	End	End	Ctrl+E or End	
Reverse search of history	F8	F8	Ctrl+R	
Pause execution of the current job			Ctrl+Z	
Insert the next character typed verbatim			Ctrl+V	
Autocomplete command/file name	Tab ↹ (enabled by default in Windows XP and later)	Tab ↹	Tab ↹ (usually once)	Esc (usually twice)
Paste contents of clipboard at cursor	Alt+Space then E then P	Ctrl+V	⇧ Shift+Ins	
Scroll window up	⇧ Shift+PageUp (may not work in some versions of Windows XP)	PageUp	⇧ Shift+PageUp	
Scroll window down	⇧ Shift+PageDown (may not work in some versions of Windows XP)	PageDown	⇧ Shift+PageDown	
Clear screen			Ctrl+L	

=== Accessibility ===
- In Windows, it is possible to disable these shortcuts using the Accessibility or Ease of Access control panel.
- In GNOME, these shortcuts are possible, if Universal Access is enabled on the system.

Action	Windows	macOS	KDE Plasma	GNOME
Utility Manager	⊞ Win+U			
Use keyboard to control cursor	Left Alt+Left Shift+Numlock			
Allow user to press shortcuts one key at a time	⇧ Shift press 5 times			⇧ Shift 5 times
Hear beep when -lock key pressed	Numlock hold 5 seconds			
Stop/slow repeating characters when key is pressed	Right Shift hold 8 seconds			⇧ Shift hold for 8 seconds
Inverse (Reverse Colors) Mode	Left Alt+Left Shift+PrtScn	⌘ Cmd+⌥ Opt+Ctrl+8	Meta+⇧ Shift+i (if enabled)	
Inverse (Reverse Colors) Mode (Only current window)			Meta+⇧ Shift+u (if enabled)	
Accessibility Shortcut (Note: This can be set as Greyscale, Invert Colours, Magnifier and more in Ease of Access settings)	Ctrl+⊞ Win+C			

== See also ==
- Keyboard shortcut
- Microsoft Windows key shortcuts
- Common User Access (CUA)
- Computer keyboard
- Human interface guidelines
- Pointing device gesture
