= SmartDrive =

MS-DOS disk caching program

- Developer: Microsoft
- Release: November 1988; 37 years ago
- Operating system: MS-DOS, Windows
- License: Proprietary commercial software

SmartDrive (or SMARTDRV) is a disk caching program shipped with MS-DOS versions 4.01 through 6.22 and Windows 3.0 through Windows 3.11. It improves data transfer rates by storing frequently accessed data in random-access memory (RAM).

Early versions of SmartDrive were loaded through a CONFIG.SYS device driver named SMARTDRV.SYS. Versions 4.0 and later were loaded through an executable file named SMARTDRV.EXE, which could be run at user's discretion or at boot time via AUTOEXEC.BAT. However, SMARTDRV.EXE also includes a double-buffering driver that should be loaded through CONFIG.SYS. Version 4.0 also introduced 32-bit disk access and could reduce its footprint in conventional memory (the first 640 kilobytes of memory which is critical to MS-DOS) by running in upper memory area (the 384 kilobytes of memory located beyond the conventional memory).

A cloaked variant of SmartDrive utilizing the Helix Cloaking API was available from Helix Software. On Intel 80386 processors, it can run in protected mode to reduce its footprint in conventional memory.

Microsoft suggests SmartDrive to be used when installing Windows 2000 or Windows XP from MS-DOS to reduce installation time.

SmartDrive has been superseded by VCache (a portion of WIN386 or VMM32), which was introduced in Windows for Workgroups 3.11 and carried over to Windows 95, Windows 98/Windows 98 SE and Windows Me. The main advantage of VCache over SmartDrive is its ability to adjust cache size dynamically. However, it tended to take too much RAM in Windows 95; this aspect was improved in Windows 98.

== See also ==
- FASTOPEN
- List of DOS commands
- 32-bit file access
