= FilterKeys =

Accessibility feature of Microsoft Windows

FilterKeys is an accessibility feature of Microsoft Windows. It configures the keyboard to ignore brief or repeated keystrokes, making typing easier for people with hand tremors, who may accidentally press keys multiple times. This feature helps to prevent unintended characters from being entered.

== History ==
Microsoft first introduced FilterKeys with Windows 95, and it remains in later versions of Windows.

== Enabling ==
There are two primary ways to enable FilterKeys:

Keyboard shortcut: The user holds down the right shift key for eight seconds. An audible cue will sound, and a pop-up notification will appear, confirming that FilterKeys has been activated.

Accessibility Settings: On Windows 10 and earlier, the feature is controlled in the "Ease of Access Center" or "Accessibility Options" of the Control Panel. On Windows 11, the setting is in the "keyboard" section of the "Accessibility" panel in the Settings app. In addition to enabling or disabling FilterKeys, the user can adjust the acceptance delay for keystrokes and configure how repeated keystrokes are handled.

== See also ==
- StickyKeys
- MouseKeys
- Togglekeys
