= Windows 95 =

1995 Microsoft operating system version

- Version of the Windows 9x operating system

- Screenshot of Windows 95, displaying its desktop, taskbar, Active Desktop, Web Widgets and Welcome screen
- Developer: Microsoft
- Working state: No longer supported
- Source model: Closed source
- Released to manufacturing: July 14, 1995; 31 years ago
- General availability: August 24, 1995; 31 years ago
- Final release: OEM Service Release 2.5 (4.0.950 C) / November 26, 1997; 28 years ago
- Supported platforms: IA-32
- Kernel type: Monolithic
- License: Proprietary commercial software
- Preceded by: Windows 3.1 (1992)
- Succeeded by: Windows 98 (1998)
- Official website: Windows 95 (archived at Wayback Machine)

Support status
- Mainstream support ended on December 31, 2000. Extended support ended on December 31, 2001.

Windows 95 is a consumer-oriented operating system developed by Microsoft, released to manufacturing on July 14, 1995, and to retail on August 24, 1995. The first of the Windows 9x line of operating systems, Windows 95, which replaced Windows 3.1, merged Microsoft's MS-DOS and Windows operating systems into a single product, and featured major changes to the core components of the operating system, such as moving from the mainly cooperatively multitasked 16-bit architecture of its predecessor to a 32-bit preemptive multitasking architecture. (Note: At least when running only 32-bit protected mode applications)

Windows 95 featured a new graphical user interface (GUI), introducing the Windows Explorer file manager, a taskbar with the Start menu and a notification area, and file shortcuts on the desktop, and implemented a number of improvements over its predecessor, including Plug-and-Play driver integration, native Internet integration, and support for longer filenames (from 8 to 255 characters). Accompanied by an extensive marketing campaign that generated much prerelease hype, it was a major success and is regarded as one of the most significant products in the personal computing industry.

Windows 95 was followed by Windows 98. Microsoft ended mainstream support for Windows 95 on December 31, 2000, with extended support lasting until December 31, 2001.

== Development ==
The initial design and planning of Windows 95 can be traced back to around March 1992 (three years before the official release of Windows 95), just before the release of Windows 3.1. At this time, Windows for Workgroups 3.11 and Windows NT 3.1 were still in development. At this point, Microsoft's strategy was to have a next generation, high-end OS based on Windows NT, namely, Cairo, and a low-end, consumer-focused one as an evolution of Windows 3.1. The latter strategy was to develop a 32-bit underlying kernel and filesystem with 32-bit protected mode device drivers in Windows for Workgroups 3.11, to be used as the basis for the next version of Windows, code named "Chicago". Cairo would be Microsoft's next-generation operating system based on Windows NT, featuring a new user interface and an object-based file system, but it was not planned to be shipped before 1994. Cairo would never be shipped, however, although elements from the Cairo project eventually shipped in Windows NT 4.0 in late July 1996, without the object-based file system, which would later evolve into WinFS.

Simultaneously with Windows 3.1's release, IBM started shipping OS/2 2.0. Microsoft realized they required an updated version of Windows that could support 32-bit applications and preemptive multitasking, but could still run on low-end hardware (Windows NT did not). Initially, the "Chicago" team did not know how the product would be packaged. Initial thoughts were there might be two products, MS-DOS 7, which would just be the underlying OS, an evolution of the Windows for Workgroups 3.11 kernel, with a character mode OS on top, and a fully integrated graphical Windows OS.

=== Beta ===
Before Windows 95's official release, users in the United States and United Kingdom had an opportunity to participate in the Windows 95 Preview Program. For US$19.95/£19.95, users would receive several 3.5-inch floppy disks that would be used to install Windows 95 either as an upgrade from Windows 3.1 or as a fresh installation. Participants were also given a free preview of The Microsoft Network (MSN), the online service that Microsoft launched with Windows 95. During the preview period, Microsoft established various electronic distribution points for promotional and technical documentation on Chicago, including a detailed document for media reviewers describing the new system highlights. The preview versions expired in November 1995, after which the user would have to purchase their copy of the final version of Windows 95.

== Architecture ==
Architectural diagram

Windows 95 was designed to be maximally compatible with existing MS-DOS and 16-bit Windows programs and device drivers while offering a more stable and better performing system. The development team purchased a copy of every PC software at a local Egghead Software and tested them on the operating system. The Windows 95 architecture is an evolution of Windows for Workgroups' 386 enhanced mode.

Configuration Manager (CONFIGMG)
Responsible for implementing Plug and Play functionality; monitoring hardware configuration changes; detecting devices using bus enumerators; and allocating I/O ports, IRQs, DMA channels and memory in a conflict-free fashion.
Installable File System Manager (Input/Output Subsystem)
Coordinates access to supported file systems. Windows 95 initially shipped with support for FAT12, FAT16, the VFAT extension, ISO 9660 (CDFS), Joliet and network redirectors, with later releases supporting FAT32.

Access requests to physical media are sent to Input/Output Supervisor, a component responsible for scheduling the requests. Each physical media has its device driver: access to the disk is performed by a port driver, while access to a SCSI device is handled by a miniport driver working atop the SCSI layer. Port and Miniport drivers perform I/O operations in 32-bit protected mode, bypassing MS-DOS and BIOS, significantly improving performance. In case there is no native Windows driver for a certain storage device, or if a device is forced to run in compatibility mode, the Real Mode Mapper can access it through MS-DOS.

32-bit Windows programs are assigned protected memory segments, which can be adjusted to any desired size, and memory areas outside the segment cannot be accessed by a program, that limited harm to other programs and the system when a program crashed. Before this, programs used fixed non-exclusive 64 KB segments. While the 64 KB size was a serious handicap in DOS and Windows 3.x, lack of guarantee of exclusiveness was the cause of stability issues because programs sometimes overwrote each other's segments, a crashing Windows 3.x program could knock out surrounding processes. Unfortunately for compatibility reasons some parts of the 32-bit Windows program memory was non-exclusive and shared among the whole system (most famously the first 1MiB of the address space), this meant that in Windows 95 a crash which incorrectly modified this shared memory could still cause harm to other programs or the system (full memory protection only came to consumer Windows systems with the launch of Windows XP).

The Win32 API is implemented by three modules, each consisting of a 16-bit and a 32-bit component:

Kernel
Provides high-level access to memory and process management, and access to the file system. Consists of KRNL386.EXE, KERNEL32.DLL, and VWIN32.VXD.
User
Responsible for managing and drawing the various user interface components, such as windows, menus and buttons. Consists of USER.EXE and USER32.DLL.
Graphics Device Interface (GDI)
Responsible for drawing graphics in a device-independent way. Consists of GDI.EXE and GDI32.DLL.

=== Dependence on MS-DOS ===
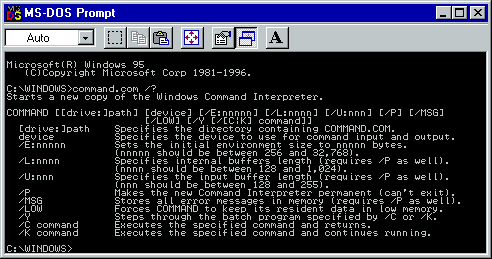
command.com running in a Windows console on Windows 95 (MS-DOS Prompt)

To end-users, MS-DOS appears as an underlying component of Windows 95. For example, it is possible to prevent the loading of the graphical user interface and boot the system into a real-mode MS-DOS environment. This was done by inserting command.com into the autoexec.bat file or changing the BootGUI variable in the MSDOS.SYS file to 0. This sparked debate amongst users and professionals regarding the extent to which Windows 95 is an operating system or merely a graphical shell running on top of MS-DOS.

When the graphical user interface is started, the virtual machine manager takes over the filesystem-related and disk-related functionality. MS-DOS itself is demoted to a compatibility layer for 16-bit device drivers. Windows 3.1 and Windows for Workgroups 3.11 could also largely bypass MS-DOS when 32-bit file access or 32-bit disk access were enabled. Keeping MS-DOS in memory allows Windows 95 to use DOS device drivers when suitable Windows drivers are unavailable. Windows 95 is capable of using all 16-bit Windows 3.x drivers.

Unlike Windows 3.x, DOS programs running in Windows 95 do not need DOS drivers for the mouse, CD-ROM and sound card; Windows drivers are used instead. HIMEM.SYS is still required to boot Windows 95. EMM386 and other memory managers, however, are only used by DOS programs. In addition, CONFIG.SYS and AUTOEXEC.BAT settings (aside from HIMEM.SYS) do not affect Windows programs. DOS games, which could not be executed on Windows 3.x, can run inside Windows 95 (games tended to lock up Windows 3.x or cause other problems). As with Windows 3.x, DOS programs that use EGA or VGA graphics modes run in windowed mode (CGA and text mode programs can continue to run).

On startup, the MS-DOS component in Windows 95 responds to a pressed F8 key by temporarily pausing the default boot process and presenting the DOS boot options menu, allowing the user to continue starting Windows normally, start Windows in safe mode or exit to the DOS prompt. As in previous versions of MS-DOS, there is no 32-bit support and DOS drivers must be loaded for mice and other hardware.

As a consequence of DOS compatibility, Windows 95 has to keep internal DOS data structures synchronized with those of Windows 95. When starting a program, even a native 32-bit Windows program, MS-DOS momentarily executes to create a data structure known as the Program Segment Prefix. It is even possible for MS-DOS to run out of conventional memory while doing so, preventing the program from launching. Windows 3.x allocated fixed segments in conventional memory first. Since the segments were allocated as fixed, Windows could not move them, which would prevent any more programs from launching.

Microsoft partially removed support for File Control Blocks (an API hold-over of DOS 1.x and CP/M) in Windows 95 OSR2 (OEM Service Release 2). FCB functions can read FAT32 volumes, but not write to them.

With merging Windows together with MS-DOS, Microsoft had effectively locked-in users who may have been using a different non-Microsoft DOS, like PC DOS and DR DOS, who could previously make use of Windows 3.x without requiring Microsoft's MS-DOS. Caldera demonstrated that Windows 95 could in fact run on top of its DR DOS operating system, and argued that Microsoft was being anti-competitive, which would prove useful in a later court case between Caldera and Microsoft.

== User interface ==
Windows 95 introduced a redesigned shell based around a desktop metaphor; File shortcuts (also known as shell links) were introduced and the windows were re-purposed to hold shortcuts to applications, files and folders, reminiscent of the Classic Mac OS. In part because of this, the ability to enter full screen mode was added to most that are functionally robust enough.

In Windows 3.1, the desktop was used to display icons of running applications. In Windows 95, the currently running applications were displayed as buttons on a taskbar across the bottom of the screen. The taskbar also contained a notification area used to display icons for background applications, a volume control and the current time.

The Start menu, invoked by clicking the "Start" button on the taskbar or by pressing the Windows key, was introduced as an additional means of launching applications or opening documents. While maintaining the program groups used by its predecessor Program Manager, it also displayed applications within cascading sub-menus.

The previous File Manager program was replaced by Windows Explorer and the Explorer-based Control Panel and several other special folders were added such as My Computer, Dial-Up Networking, Recycle Bin, Network Neighborhood, My Documents, Recent documents, Fonts, Printers, and My Briefcase among others. AutoRun was introduced for CD drives.

The user interface looked dramatically different from prior versions of Windows; however, its design language did not have a special name like Platinum in Mac OS 8 and Mac OS 9, Aqua in macOS, Aero in Windows Vista and Windows 7, Metro in Windows 8, Windows 8.1, and Windows 10, and Material Design in most Google products since 2014. Internally it was called "the new shell" and later simply "the shell". The subproject within Microsoft to develop the new shell was internally known as "Stimpy".

When released for Windows 95 and Windows NT 4.0, Internet Explorer 4 came with an optional Windows Desktop Update, which modified the shell to provide several additional updates to Windows Explorer, including a Quick Launch toolbar, and new features integrated with Internet Explorer, such as Active Desktop (which allowed Internet content to be displayed directly on the desktop).

Some of the user interface elements introduced in Windows 95, such as the desktop, taskbar, Start menu and Windows Explorer file manager, remained fundamentally unchanged on future versions of Windows.

=== Startup sound ===
"The Microsoft Sound"
Startup sound for Windows 95, composed by Brian Eno

The Windows startup sound was composed by the English musician Brian Eno. In 2025, it was selected for preservation in the National Recording Registry by the Library of Congress as "culturally, historically and/or aesthetically significant".

== Technical improvements ==
Windows 95 included support for 255-character mixed-case long filenames and preemptively multitasked protected-mode 32-bit applications. 16-bit processes were still co-operatively multitasked.

=== Plug and Play ===
Windows 95 tried to automate device detection and configuration as much as possible, but could still fall back to manual settings if necessary. During the initial install process of Windows 95, it would attempt to automatically detect all devices installed in the system.

Windows 95 also introduced the Device Manager to indicate which devices were working optimally with correct drivers and configuration and to allow the user to override automatic Plug and Play-based driver installation with manual options or give a choice of several semi-automatic configurations to try to free up resources for devices that still needed manual configuration.

Windows 95 also has built-in support for Advanced Power Management.

=== Long file names ===
32-bit File Access is necessary for the long file names feature introduced with Windows 95 through the use of the VFAT file system extension. It is available to both Windows programs and MS-DOS programs started from Windows (they have to be adapted slightly, since accessing long file names requires using larger pathname buffers and hence different system calls). Competing DOS-compatible operating systems released before Windows 95 cannot see these names. Using older versions of DOS utilities to manipulate files means that the long names are not visible and are lost if files are moved or renamed and by the copy (but not the original) if the file is copied. During a Windows 95 automatic upgrade of an older Windows 3.1 system, DOS and third-party disk utilities which can destroy long file names are identified and made unavailable. When Windows 95 is started in DOS mode, e.g. for running DOS programs, low-level access to disks is locked out. In case the need arises to depend on disk utilities that do not recognize long file names, such as the MS-DOS 6.x's defrag utility, a program called LFNBACK for backup and restoration of long file names is provided on the CD-ROM, specifically in its \ADMIN\APPTOOLS\LFNBACK directory.

=== 32-bit ===
Windows 95 followed Windows for Workgroups 3.11 with its lack of support for older, 16-bit x86 processors, thus requiring an Intel 80386 (or compatible). While the OS kernel is 32-bit, much code (especially for the user interface) remained 16-bit for performance reasons as well as development time constraints.

The introduction of 32-bit file access in Windows for Workgroups 3.11 meant that 16-bit real mode MS-DOS is not used for managing the files while Windows is running, and the earlier introduction of the 32-bit disk access means that the PC BIOS is often no longer used for managing hard disks. DOS can be used for running old-style drivers for compatibility, but Microsoft discourages using them, as this prevents proper multitasking and impairs system stability. Control Panel allows a user to see which MS-DOS components are used by the system; optimal performance is achieved when they are bypassed. The Windows kernel uses MS-DOS style real-mode drivers in Safe Mode, which exists to allow a user to fix problems relating to loading native, protected-mode drivers.

=== Core improvements in OEM Service Releases ===
OEM Service Releases of Windows 95 introduced support in Windows for several core new technologies that were not included in the original release of Windows 95. These include the Internet Explorer web browser, DriveSpace compression, OpenGL, DirectX, FAT32 file system support, DMA mode for disk drives, Universal Serial Bus and Accelerated Graphics Port.

=== Accessibility features ===
Windows 95 introduced computer accessibility features like Sticky keys, FilterKeys, ToggleKeys, Mouse keys. Microsoft Active Accessibility API was introduced as an add-on for Windows 95.

== System requirements ==
Official system requirements were an Intel 386DX CPU (12 or 16 MHz being the slowest), 4 MB of system RAM and 50–55 MB of hard disk space, depending on features selected. These minimal claims were made in order to maximize the available market of Windows 3.1 migrations. This configuration would rely heavily on virtual memory and was only optimal for productive use on single-tasking dedicated workstations. It was possible to run Windows 95 on a 386SX, but this led to even less acceptable performance due to its 16-bit external data bus. To achieve optimal performance, Microsoft recommended an i486 or compatible CPU with at least 8 MB of RAM.

Windows 95 may fail to boot on computers with a processor faster than 2.1 GHz and more than approximately 480 MB of memory. In such a case, reducing the file cache size or the size of video memory can help. The theoretical maximum according to Microsoft is 2 GB.

Most copies of Windows 95 were on CD-ROM, but a 3 1/2-inch floppy version was also available for older machines. The retail floppy disk version of Windows 95 came on 13 DMF-formatted floppy disks, while OSR2.1 doubled the floppy count to 26. Both versions exclude additional software that the CD-ROM version might have featured. Microsoft Plus! for Windows 95 was also available on floppy disks. OSR2.5 dropped support for floppy installation.

== Upgradeability ==
Windows 95 was superseded by Windows 98, which also included the Windows Desktop Update and Internet Explorer 4 by default. It could still be directly upgraded by either Windows 2000 Professional or Windows Me. The last version of Microsoft Office available for Windows 95 is Office 2000 (released in June 1999). Similarly, Windows Media Player 7.0, released in June 2000, and DirectX 8.0a, released in January 2001, are the last versions of Windows Media Player and DirectX available for Windows 95, respectively. The last version of Windows Installer available for Windows 95 is Windows Installer 2.0 (released in August 2001), respectively.

Updates for Windows 95 could be installed via the Windows Update website. The Windows Update website for Windows 95 and 98 was shut down in 2011. An independent project named Windows Update Restored aims to restore the Windows Update websites for older versions of Windows, including Windows 95.

While Windows 95 did not officially support the .NET Framework, versions 2.0 and 3.5 were unofficially backported for the operating system in 2024.

=== Internet Explorer ===
Windows 95 originally shipped without Internet Explorer, and the default network installation did not include TCP/IP, the network protocol used on the Internet. At the release date of Windows 95, Internet Explorer 1.0 was available, but only in the Plus! add-on pack for Windows 95, which was a separate product. The Plus! pack did not reach as many retail consumers as the operating system itself (it was mainly advertised for its non-Internet-related add-ons such as themes and better disk compression) but was usually included in pre-installed (OEM) sales, and at the time of Windows 95's release, the web was being browsed mainly with a variety of early web browsers such as NCSA Mosaic and Netscape Navigator (promoted by products such as IBox).

Windows 95 OEM Service Release 1 was the first release of Windows to include Internet Explorer (version 2.0) with the OS. While there was no uninstaller, it could be deleted easily if desired. OEM Service Release 2 included Internet Explorer 3. The installation of Internet Explorer 4 on Windows 95 (or the OSR2.5 version preinstalled on a computer, 486 or later processor is required) gave Windows 95 Active Desktop and browser integration into Windows Explorer, known as the Windows Desktop Update. The CD version of the last release of Windows 95, OEM Service Release 2.5 (version 4.00.950C), includes Internet Explorer 4, and installs it after Windows 95's initial setup and first boot are complete.

While only the 4.x series of the browser contained the option to install the Windows Desktop Update features, the subsequent 5.x version had the option hidden. Editing the installer's configuration file located in a temporary folder would make the feature available in the installer. Alternatively, Windows 95 and Windows NT 4.0 users could first install IE 4 with the desktop update before installing a newer version of Internet Explorer. The last version of Internet Explorer available for Windows 95 is Internet Explorer 5.5 with SP2, (released in July 2001). Windows 95 shipped with Microsoft's dial-up online service called The Microsoft Network (MSN).

== Release and promotion ==
Sales were projected as high as $720 million on release day. The marketing campaign for Windows 95 was estimated at $1 billion and spanned the entire industry. The Windows 95 release included a commercial featuring The Rolling Stones' 1981 single "Start Me Up" (a reference to the Start button). It was widely reported that Microsoft paid the Rolling Stones between US$8 and US$14 million for the use of the song in the Windows 95 advertising campaign. However, Microsoft said that this was just a rumour spread by the band to increase their market value, and the company paid US$3 million. A 30-minute promotional video, labeled a "cyber sitcom," featuring Jennifer Aniston and Matthew Perry, was also released to showcase the features of Windows 95. Microsoft's US$200 million advertising campaign featured stories of people waiting in line outside stores to get a copy.

In the UK, the largest computer chain, PC World, received a large quantity of point-of-sale material; many branches opened at midnight to sell the first copies of the product. Copies of The Times were available for free, and Microsoft paid for 1.5 million issues (twice the daily circulation at the time).

In the United States, the Empire State Building in New York City was lit to match the colors of the Windows logo. In Canada, a 100 m (330 ft) banner was hung down the side of the CN Tower in Toronto.

The release included a number of "Fun Stuff" items on the CD, including music videos of Edie Brickell's "Good Times" and Weezer's "Buddy Holly," a trailer for the 1995 film Rob Roy and the computer game Hover! Shortly after the release of Windows 95, Microsoft distributed a sampler disc titled Games for Windows 95. It included over a dozen trial versions of the first batch of games that were specifically built for Windows 95, such as Al Unser Jr. Arcade Racing, Doom 95, Fury3, Ice & Fire, MechWarrior 2, amongst others.

Sales were strong, with one million copies shipped worldwide in just four days. According to International Data Corporation, by the end of 1998, Windows 95 was the most used desktop OS with 57.4% of the marketshare, with its successor Windows 98 coming in second at 17.2%. Windows 95 also still sold more non-OEM copies to large customers in the month of May 1999, which analysts attributed to large companies opting to wait for the release of Windows 2000.

=== Editions ===
Several Windows 95 editions have been released. Only the original release and the Service Pack 1 reissue were sold as a shrink-wrapped products; later editions were provided only to computer OEMs for installation on new PCs. For this reason, these editions are known as OEM Service Releases (OSR).

Together with the introduction of Windows 95, Microsoft released the Microsoft Plus! for Windows 95 pack, which contained several optional components for high-end multimedia PCs, including Internet Explorer, DriveSpace and additional themes.

Service Pack 1 was made available half a year after the original release and fixed several small bugs.

Service Pack 2 mainly introduced support for new hardware, most notably support for hard drives larger than 2 GB in the form of the FAT32 file system. This release was never made available to end-users directly and was only sold through OEMs (OSR2) with the purchase of a new PC.

A full third service pack was never released, but two smaller revisions to the second were released in the form of a USB Supplement (OSR2.1) and the Windows Desktop Update (OSR2.5). Both were made available as updated disc images shipped by OEMs, and the Windows Desktop Update was also released with the standalone Internet Explorer 4.0 release. OSR2.5 was notable for featuring several changes to the Windows Explorer, integrating it with Internet Explorer 4.0—this version of Internet Explorer looks very similar to the one featured in Windows 98.

To celebrate the launch of Windows 95, Microsoft released a special edition of Windows 95 in a possibly limited production of 3,000 units.

Release	Code name	Release date	CD-Code	Version			Software components					Hardware support							
Release	Code name	Release date	CD-Code	System properties (Note: The version string displayed in the "System properties" tab. Right-click on "My Computer" and choose "Properties".)	System files (Note: The version of updated system files. Note that most system files which have not been updated often retain their old version number. Version numbers are not consistently used: some system files may have older or newer build numbers or use a version numbering scheme separate from regular system files.)	Timestamp	MS-DOS	Internet Explorer (Note: Upgradable to 5.5)	DriveSpace	OpenGL	DirectX (Note: Upgradable to 8.0a)	FAT32	Infrared	DMA	IRQ steering	USB	AGP	MMX	P6
Windows 95 (retail and OEM)	Chicago	August 24, 1995	0795	4.00.950	4.00.950	1995-07-11 09:50:00	7.0	1.0 (OEM only)	2	—N/a	—N/a	No	Yes* (Note: Available as a separate update which can be installed on the RTM release.)	No	No	No	No	Bugs	Bugs
Microsoft Plus! for Windows 95	Frosting	August 24, 1995	—N/a	—N/a	4.40.310	1995-07-14 04:40:00	7.0	1.0	3	—N/a	—N/a	No	Yes*	No	No	No	No	Bugs	Bugs
Service Pack 1	—N/a	February 14, 1996	—N/a	4.00.950a	4.00.951 (Note: Some components have higher build numbers up to 955.)	1995-12-31 09:50:00	7.0	2.0	2	—N/a	—N/a	No	Yes	No	No	No	No	Bugs	Bugs
OEM Service Release 1	—N/a	February 14, 1996	0196	4.00.950a	4.00.951	1995-12-29 09:51:00	7.0	2.0	2	—N/a	—N/a	No	Yes	No	No	No	No	Bugs	Bugs
OEM Service Release 2	Detroit	August 30, 1996	0796	4.00.950 B	4.00.1111	1996-08-24 11:11:11	7.1	3.0	3	1.1	2.0a	Yes	Yes	Yes	Yes	Yes* (Note: By installing the USB Supplement update, named usbsupp.exe.)	Yes*	Yes	Yes* (Note: By installing either the Memory Management fix, named VMM2XUPD.EXE (official), or the USB supplement 4.03.1216, named usbupd2.exe, distributed with OSR2.5 only (unofficial for OSR2 and OSR2.1). usbupd2.exe is not a cumulative update, hence usbsupp.exe must be installed beforehand.)
USB Supplement to OSR2	—N/a		—N/a	4.00.950 B	4.03.1212 (Note: Original release of the USB Supplement to OSR2, distributed by OEMs as an update for OSR2, or as a Windows sampler release through MSDN, prior to the release of OSR2.1.)	1996-10-23 13:12:00	7.1	3.0	3	1.1	2.0a	Yes	Yes	Yes	Yes	Yes	Yes	Yes	Yes*
OEM Service Release 2.1 (Note: Includes an updated RMM.PDR file, version 4.00.1112, which fixes IOS related Windows protection errors.) (Note: Certain European releases include an updated Winboot.sys, which fixes the less than expected available conventional memory error.) (Note: The included USB Supplement is not installed automatically during the installation of Windows, and must be installed manually afterwards.)	—N/a	August 27, 1997	0197 (US) / 0397	4.00.950 B	4.03.1214 (Note: Updated version of the USB Supplement to OSR2, distributed with OSR2.1 and OSR2.5.)	1997-04-10 12:14:00	7.1	3.0	3	1.1	2.0a	Yes	Yes	Yes	Yes	Yes	Yes	Yes	Yes*
OEM Service Release 2.5 (Note: The updated RMM.PDR file isn't included, however it's installed as part of Internet Explorer 4.0.) (Note: Includes an updated VMM.VXD file (embedded inside the VMM32.VXD file), version 4.00.1113, from the Memory Management fix.)	—N/a	November 26, 1997	1297	4.00.950 C	4.03.1216 (Note: The Microsoft Knowledge Base reports 4.03.1214. This USB Supplement to OSR2 (distributed with OSR2.5 only, named usbupd2.exe) contains an updated VMM.VXD with support for the Pentium Pro and Pentium II. This file has version 4.03.1216 and has a timestamp of September 23, 1997 09:51:18. It is not a cumulative update, hence usbsupp.exe must be installed beforehand.)	1997-11-26 12:16:00	7.1	4.00	3	1.1	5.0 (Note: The included DirectX 5.0 is not installed automatically during the installation of Windows, and must be installed manually afterwards from the disc.)	Yes	Yes	Yes	Yes	Yes	Yes	Yes	Yes

==== Pen Services for Windows 95 ====
Pen Services for Windows 95 is the successor to Windows for Pen Computing that added pen computing features in Windows 95 for use in Tablet PCs, which added among others, an on-screen keyboard, a notepad program for writing with the stylus, and a program for training the system to respond accurately to the user's handwriting. It was succeeded by Windows XP Tablet PC Edition in 2002.

== Reception ==
As the cover story of its August 1995 issue, PC World featured an extensive review of the system, highlighting new features and shortcomings, with an editorial by the magazine's editor in chief stating that staff consensus about the user interface was "a standing ovation, with more than a few raspberries for the Explorer". Before general release, The New York Times published an article about the new operating system, listing positives which included "an extremely Mac-like cosmetic makeover", performance improvements when using multiple programs at once, and convenient installation of drivers; however, it was added that "the industrial-strength Windows NT and OS/2 Warp offer greater stability and better multitasking" for corporate users. In its October 1995 Emory Report, Emory University praised the system's user-friendly interface, but criticized its stability and networking limitations. A November 1996 column in Fortune acknowledged the system's widespread adoption but scrutinized its bugs, hardware requirements, and Microsoft's dominance.

== Legacy ==
On December 31, 2001, Microsoft ended its support for Windows 95 (as well as previous versions of Windows dating back to Windows 1.0), making it an "obsolete" product per the Microsoft Lifecycle Policy. Many features that have since become key components of the Windows series, such as the Start menu and the taskbar, originated in Windows 95. Neil MacDonald, a Gartner analyst, said that Windows 95 "was a quantum leap in difference in technological capability and stability". Ina Fried of CNET said that "by the time Windows 95 was finally ushered off the market in 2001, it had become a fixture on computer desktops around the world".

The basic design of Windows 95, with its combination of a desktop that can be used as a storage location, a pop-out application menu, and a taskbar showing running applications, a clock and a system tray, was strongly influential on future user interfaces for desktop operating systems. The core UI concepts of Windows 95 have persisted up to the present day in Windows itself, as well as on other operating systems like Linux, with the default behavior of desktop environments like KDE and XFCE replicating it in many aspects.

Even though support for Windows 95 has ended, the software has occasionally remained in use on legacy systems for various purposes. In addition, some video-game enthusiasts choose to use Windows 95 for their legacy system to play old DOS games, although some other versions of Windows such as Windows 98 can also be used for this purpose.

== See also ==
- Windows 9x
