= ToggleKeys =

Accessibility function for Microsoft Windows

ToggleKeys (or Toggle Keys) is a feature of Microsoft Windows. It is an accessibility function which is designed for people who have vision impairment or cognitive disabilities. When ToggleKeys is turned on, the computer will provide sound cues when the locking keys (⇪ Caps Lock, Num Lock, or Scroll Lock) are pressed. A high-pitched sound plays when the keys are switched on and a low-pitched sound plays when they are switched off.

== History ==
Microsoft first introduced ToggleKeys with Windows 95. The feature is also used in later versions of Windows.

== Enabling ==
ToggleKeys can be enabled by pressing and holding the Num Lock key for 5 seconds. This feature can also be turned on and off via the Accessibility or Ease of Access icon found either in the Control Panel or from within the Settings app.

== See also ==
- FilterKeys
- MouseKeys
- StickyKeys
