= Microsoft 32-bit file access =

32-bit file access refers to the higher performance, protected mode disk caching method introduced in Windows for Workgroups 3.11, which replaced SmartDrive (Smartdrv). It bypassed MS-DOS and directly accessed the disk, either via the BIOS or (preferably) 32-bit disk access (Windows-native protected mode disk drivers). This feature was a backport from the then-unreleased Windows 95, as suggested by Microsoft's advertisements for Windows for Workgroups 3.11 ("the 32-bit file system from our Chicago project").

It was implemented using the VFAT, VCACHE, and IFSMgr VxD drivers.

Also, it should not be confused with 32-bit disk access. Although both technologies are similar, 32-bit disk access (also known as FastDisk) pre-dates Windows for Workgroups 3.11. 32-bit file access provided a 32-bit code path for Windows to directly access the disk bus by intercepting the MS-DOS Int 21H services while remaining in 386 protected mode, rather than handling the Int 21H services in real mode by MS-DOS. 32-bit disk access offers relatively less performance and is less likely to work on many computers than 32-bit file access. 32-bit file access does not need 32-bit disk access.

== See also ==
- 32-bit disk access
- IFSHLP.SYS
