= Microsoft 32-bit disk access =

32-bit Disk Access (also known as FastDisk) refers to a special disk access and caching mode available in older, MS-DOS-based Microsoft Windows operating systems. It was a set of protected mode device drivers that worked together to take advantage of advanced disk I/O features in the system BIOS. It filtered interrupt 13h BIOS calls to the disk controller and directed them in the most efficient way for the system — either through the 32-bit interface with the hard disk controller or through the system BIOS. Using 32-bit Disk Access allowed for more pageable memory in Windows to page MS-DOS–based applications to disk to free enough RAM for applications when they needed to use it. Sometimes enabling this mode would break older applications of the day.

Windows 3.1 had an option in its 386 Enhanced Control Panel that would enable 32-bit read & write access in 386 enhanced mode. Usually, 32-bit read could be safely enabled, but 32-bit write had issues with a number of applications. 32-bit Disk Access was the feature that made it possible to page MS-DOS applications to disk. Without it, if the real mode disk code (the Int 13h handler) was paged out, the virtual DOS machine would loop forever.

32-bit disk access should not be confused with 32-bit file access. Although both technologies are similar, 32-bit disk access was introduced with Windows 3.1 and file access with Windows for Workgroups 3.11. 32-bit file access provided a 32-bit code path for Windows to directly access the disk bus by intercepting the MS-DOS Int 21H services while remaining in 386 protected mode and at CPU speeds, rather than handling the Int 21H services in real mode by MS-DOS. 32-bit disk access offers less performance and is less likely to work on many computers than 32-bit file access. 32-bit file access does not require 32-bit disk access.

The 32-bit disk access relied on IDE controllers, and it may not work on hard drives larger than 504 MB.

Windows 95, Windows 98, and Windows Me use native, protected mode 32-bit disk drivers during normal operation. However Safe Mode uses MS-DOS real mode disk drivers instead. Real mode MS-DOS drivers could also be used during normal operation for disk peripherals for which Windows did not have native drivers.

32-bit versions of the Windows NT family of operating systems including the newer Windows 2000, Windows XP, Windows Server 2003, Windows Vista and later always have 32-bit disk drivers active, cannot use MS-DOS drivers at all, and the expression is not used for them.

== See also ==
- Explanation of SMARTDRV & 32-bit disk access from Microsoft
- 32-bit in Windows 3.1 / 9x
- Windows for Workgroups 3.11 from Yale PCLT
