= Slow keys =

Computer accessibility feature

Slow keys is a feature of computer desktop environments. It is an accessibility feature to aid users who have physical disabilities. Slow keys allows the user to specify the duration for which one must press-and-hold a key before the system accepts the keypress.
