= Sticky keys =

Accessibility feature

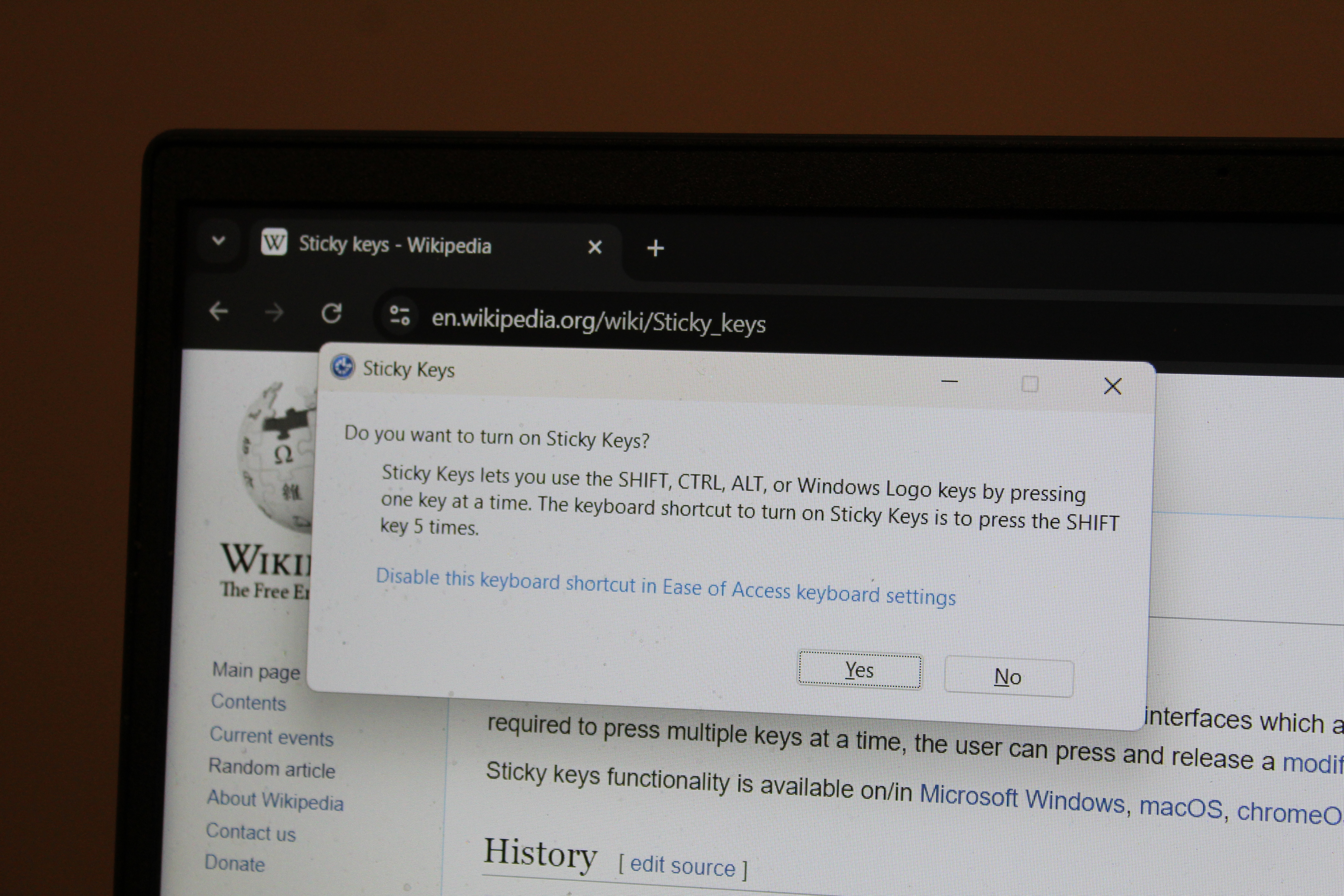
Sticky keys on a Windows laptop

Sticky keys is an accessibility feature of some graphical user interfaces which assists users who have physical disabilities or helps users reduce repetitive strain injury. It serializes keystrokes; instead of being required to press multiple keys at a time, the user can press and release a modifier key, such as ⇧ Shift, Ctrl, Alt, or the Windows key, and have it remain active until any other key is pressed.

Sticky keys functionality is available on/in Microsoft Windows, macOS, chromeOS and KDE Plasma as Sticky Keys (previously stylized StickyKeys on Windows), and on Unix/X11 systems as part of the AccessX utility.

== History ==
Sticky Keys was first introduced to System 6 as part of the Easy Access extension, which also included mouse keys functionality.

In 1994, Solaris 2.4 shipped with the AccessX utility, which also provided sticky keys and mouse keys functionality.

== See also ==
- FilterKeys
- Mouse keys
- Slow keys
