= Windows 3.1 =

1992 Microsoft operating system version

- Version of the Microsoft Windows operating system

- Screenshot of Windows for Workgroups 3.11
- Developer: Microsoft
- Working state: No longer supported
- Source model: Closed source
- Released to manufacturing: April 6, 1992; 34 years ago
- Final release: 3.11 / November 8, 1993; 33 years ago
- Kernel type: Monolithic
- License: Commercial software
- Preceded by: Windows 3.0 (1990)
- Succeeded by: Windows 95 (1995) (consumer client); Windows NT 3.1 (1993) (business client)

Support status
- Obsolete
- Retail: Unsupported as of December 31, 2001.
- WFW 3.11 embedded: Unsupported as of November 1, 2008.

Windows 3.1 is a consumer-oriented operating system developed by Microsoft, released to manufacturing on April 6, 1992. Unlike its predecessors, which ran as a shell on top of MS-DOS, its 386 Enhanced Mode functioned as a virtual machine monitor virtualizing DOS as a guest. It was the last Windows 16-bit operating system, after which future versions of Windows moved to 32-bit.

Windows 3.1 introduced the TrueType font system as a competitor to Adobe Type Manager. Its multimedia was also expanded, and screensavers were introduced, alongside new software such as Media Player (also known as "Windows Media Player") and Sound Recorder. File Manager and Control Panel received tweaks, while Windows 3.1 also saw the introduction of the Windows Registry and add-ons, and it could utilize more memory than its predecessors.

Microsoft also released special versions of Windows 3.1 throughout 1992 and 1993; in Europe and Japan, Windows 3.1 was introduced with more language support, while Tandy Video Information System received a special version, called Modular Windows. In November 1993, Windows 3.11 was released as a minor update, while Windows 3.2 was released as a Simplified Chinese version of Windows 3.1. (Note: Collectively, these versions of Windows 3.1 are known as Windows 3.1x.) Microsoft also introduced Windows for Workgroups, the first version of Windows to allow integrated networking. Mostly oriented towards businesses, it received network improvements and it allowed users to share files, use print servers, and chat online, while it also introduced peer-to-peer networking.

The series is considered to be an improvement on its predecessors. It was praised for its reinvigoration of the user interface and technical design. Windows 3.1 sold over three million copies during the first three months of its release, although its counterpart Windows for Workgroups was noted as a "business disappointment" due to its small amount of sold copies. It was succeeded by Windows 95, and Microsoft ended the support for Windows 3.1 series on December 31, 2001, except for the embedded version, which was retired in 2008.

== Development history ==
Early version of the Windows 3.1 logo, used in 1991

Windows 3.0, the predecessor of 3.1, was released in 1990, and is considered to be the first version of Windows to receive critical acclaim. Windows 3.0 received around 10 million sales before the release of Windows 3.1 on April 6, 1992. Microsoft began a television advertising campaign for the first time on March 1, 1992. The advertisements, developed by Ogilvy & Mather, were designed to introduce a broader audience to Windows.

Unlike its predecessors, Windows 3.1's 386 Enhanced Mode ran as a virtual machine monitor virtualizing MS-DOS as a guest, and does not include the MS-DOS Executive shell. After the introduction of Windows 1.0, Microsoft had worked on gaining support from companies to expand its operating environment on different types of PCs. Tandy Corporation was open to shipping Tandy Sensation PCs with Windows 3.1. IBM and its PCs were also provided with Windows 3.1.

== Release versions and features ==
=== Windows 3.1 ===
Windows 3.1, showing some of the personalization options available

Further enhancements were introduced in Windows 3.1. The TrueType font system was introduced to provide scalable fonts to Windows applications, without having to rely on using third-party technology such as Adobe Type Manager (ATM). Windows 3.1 introduced Arial, Courier New, and Times New Roman fonts, in regular, bold, italic, and bold–italic versions, which could be scaled to any size and rotated, depending on the application.

To improve user interaction, Microsoft initiated warning and event sounds, and introduced computer command shortcuts for copy, cut, and paste. Windows 3.1 is also noted for its improvement of multimedia; screensavers, Windows Media Player, and Sound Recorder were introduced into the operating system. These features were already present on the Windows 3.0 with Multimedia Extensions version, although they were only available to users with newly bought PCs. The Media Player could play MIDI music files and AVI video files, while the Sound Recorder could play, record, and edit sound files that were affiliated with the WAV format. Minesweeper was officially introduced in Windows 3.1 as a replacement for Reversi, alongside Solitaire. MS-DOS programs were previously not able to be controlled with a mouse; this ended up being introduced in Windows 3.1. Object Linking and Embedding (OLE) was added to allow drag-and-drop embedding of images and formatted text between Windows programs. SVGA color support was also introduced in this version.

File Manager had also received tweaks; split view-mode was introduced, users were now able to browse files without having to open separate windows, while files were able to be dragged and dropped to other locations on the system. An option for quick formatting was introduced to format floppy disks and copy its files without having to quit Windows. File Manager is an MDI application that is used for moving, deleting, and managing files on the system. Microsoft also built Microsoft Bob, a utility that would act as a search assistant, on Windows 3.1, only for it to be released on Windows 95 in 1995. The introduction of Windows Registry, a centralized database that could store configuration information and settings for various operating systems components and applications, also occurred in this version. The Control Panel also received changes; its items were now hard-coded, and additional items could be added by placing additional .cpl files. Similarly, the Calendar uses the .cal extension. Printer management tasks were moved over to Control Panel and Print Manager. Several printer drivers were improved in Windows 3.1, making the Print Manager more efficient to use. Windows 3.1 also includes troubleshooting and diagnostic tools such as the Dr. Watson utility which saves information about application errors, and Microsoft Diagnostics.

Windows 3.1 also includes add-ons; Video for Windows was introduced in November 1992 as a reaction to Apple's QuickTime technology. At the price of $200, the software included editing and encoding programs. It was later built into Windows 95. Microsoft also published Windows for Pen Computing, a pen computing interface which was created in response to PenPoint OS by GO Corporation. The operating system was also given limited compatibility with the then-new 32-bit Windows API, by introducing Win32s, an enabling technology. Microsoft also provided WinG, an application program interface, to entice developers to move from DOS to Windows. It also provided a device-independent interface to graphics and printer hardware, and allowed programs to have both read and write capabilities to the WinGDC.

Windows 3.1 in 386 Enhanced Mode ran as a virtual machine monitor virtualizing MS-DOS, with Standard Mode serving as a compatibility mode for the Intel 80286 series of processors. As with the later operating system Windows 95, it booted from MS-DOS, and used filesystem services from it in Virtual 8086 machines at runtime by default, except where FastDisk was enabled. Its kernel, KRNL386.EXE, managed the system's resources and memory, scheduled tasks and mediated file I/O between Windows and MS-DOS, USER.EXE ran the operating system's graphical environment and handled window management and input, and GDI.EXE handled fonts and graphical output.

Unlike all previous versions, Windows 3.1 could not run in real mode and it insisted on the use of 80286 processors or above. Because of this, the maximum memory available was increased. While Windows 3.0 was limited to 16 MB maximum memory, Windows 3.1 could access a theoretical 4 GB in the 386 enhanced mode. The actual practical ceiling is 256 MB. Like its predecessors, it runs as a 16-bit system; Windows 3.1 is also the last Windows to run in 16-bit mode. It is also the first Windows to be distributed on a CD-ROM. The setup interface was simplified; express mode was introduced to automatically set up Windows. Windows 3.1 also includes an online tutorial applet for users regarding the use of the Windows 3.1 user interface. In addition it supported the Advanced Power Management standard.

=== Windows 3.1 for Central and Eastern Europe ===
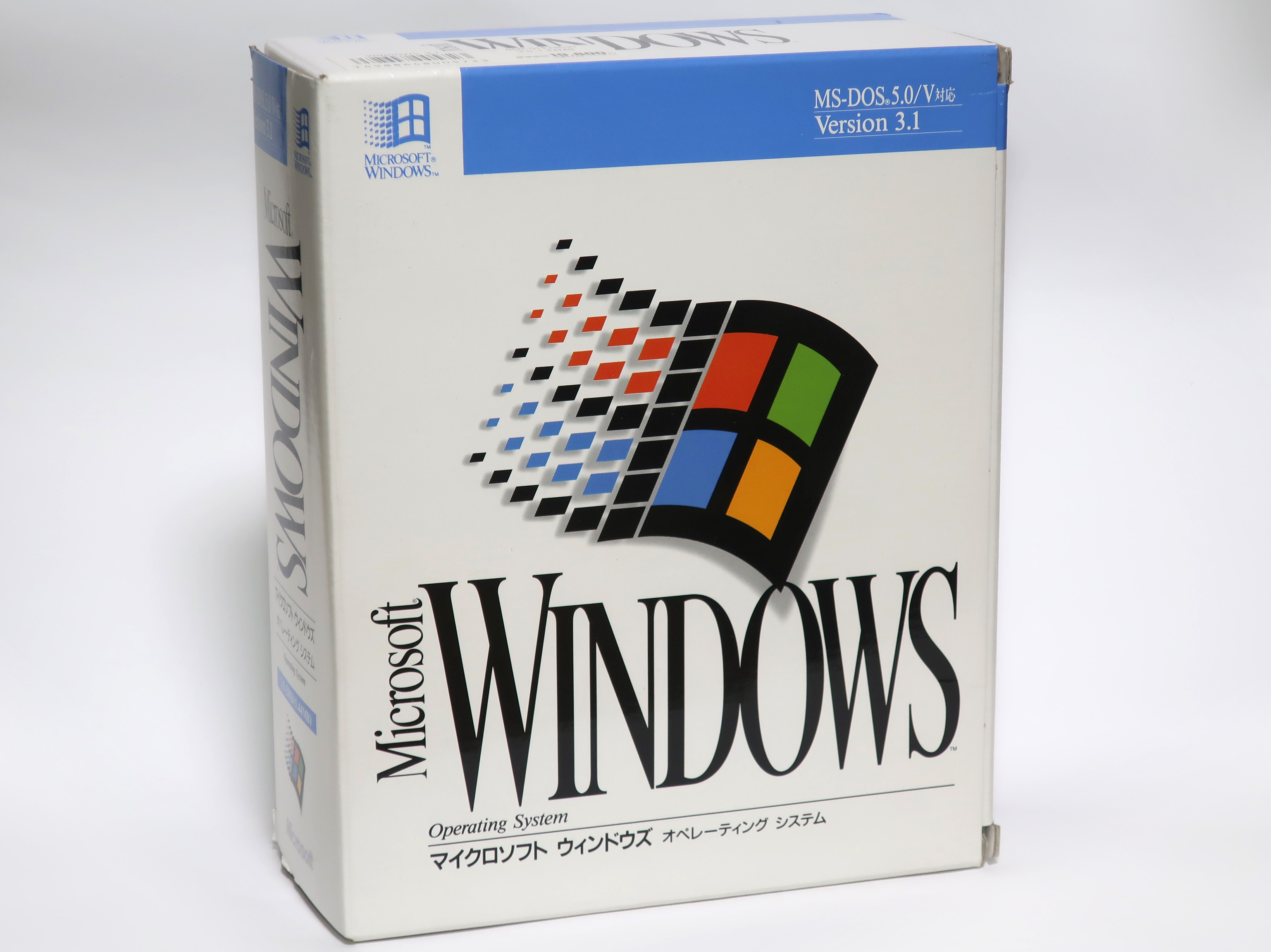
Retail box of the Japanese version of Windows 3.1

A special version named "Windows 3.1 for Central and Eastern Europe" introduced eleven languages to Windows 3.1. It also provided support for the Cyrillic script. To use Czech, Hungarian, and Polish terminology this version was required, while to use Russian terminology a Russian version of Windows 3.1 was needed. Similarly, Microsoft also released Windows 3.1J with support for Japanese, which shipped 1.46 million copies in its first year on the market (1993) in Japan.

=== Modular Windows ===
Modular Windows was built for real-time consumer electronics, and was designed to be controlled via television. This special version of Windows 3.1 was designed to run on the Tandy Video Information System; it allowed users to run multimedia software without having to buy a personal computer. It also contained a software development kit (SDK) for programmers to write applications that would run on devices that have Modular Windows. The SDK was sold for $99. Modular Windows was discontinued in 1994.

=== Windows 3.11 ===
Released on November 8, 1993, Windows 3.11 was introduced with fixes for network problems which were present on Windows 3.1. As a minor update, new features were not present in this version. It also did not run on IBM's OS/2 for Windows. Windows 3.11 allowed users to connect to each other as peers to share the resources of their computers. Microsoft replaced all retail and OEM versions of Windows 3.1 with Windows 3.11 and provided a free upgrade to anyone who owned Windows 3.1.

=== Windows 3.2 ===
An updated Simplified Chinese version of Windows 3.1 was released in November 1993, as Windows 3.2. The update was limited to this language version, as it only fixed issues related to the complex input system for the Simplified Chinese language. A font editor is present in Windows 3.2; it is used to add new Chinese characters to the already-existing fonts.

== Windows for Workgroups ==
Windows for Workgroups logo

Windows for Workgroups served as an update to Windows 3.1, and it was the first version of Windows that was suitable for integrated networking. Initially developed as an add-on for Windows 3.0, it was later released in 1992. It introduced drivers and protocols for peer-to-peer networking. Windows for Workgroups was mostly oriented towards businesses.

=== Windows for Workgroups 3.1 ===
The first version of Windows for Workgroups, 3.1, was released on October 27, 1992. Codenamed Winball and Sparta, it allows users to share files, use print servers, and chat online; files could be accessed from other machines that ran either Windows or DOS. The Microsoft Hearts card game was also added, while Object Linking and Embedding, which was implemented in Windows 3.1, was also included in the Windows for Workgroups version. The Workgroups version also introduced the Microsoft Mail program, which allowed users to receive and send email, and Microsoft Schedule+, a time management app.

Windows for Workgroups could also be accessed from an OS/2 client that uses the Server Message Block (SMB), a protocol used for sharing files and printers over local networks. It introduced support for the NetBEUI protocol. The price sat at $69 for Windows 3.1 users.

=== Windows for Workgroups 3.11 ===
Network capabilities of Windows for Workgroups 3.11

The other version, Windows for Workgroups 3.11, was released on November 8, 1993. It was codenamed Snowball, and it introduced support for 32-bit file access, drive sharing, and group calendaring. It also has built-in fax capabilities.

It received network improvements; a Winsock package was released for Windows for Workgroups, although it was later replaced by a 32-bit stack add-on package (codenamed Wolverine) that provided TCP/IP support in Windows for Workgroups 3.11. Its connectivity with NetWare networks was increased, while it also introduced support for Open Data-Link Interface (ODI) cards and Internetwork Packet Exchange (IPX) drivers. Remote access service (RAS) was introduced as a product for users to remotely access Windows NT and its Advanced Server networks.

It runs in 80386 enhanced mode, and it supports the use of network redirectors. It was sold in two versions; the complete package cost $219 while the "Workgroup Add-on for Windows" cost $69.

== Windows for Pen Computing ==
Microsoft Windows for Pen Computing
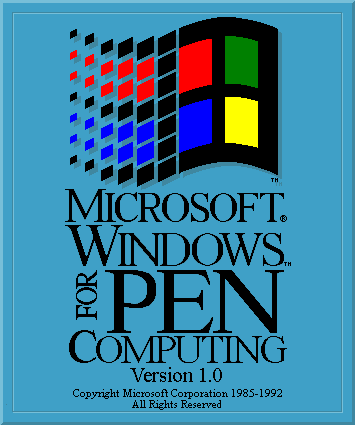
- Original author: Microsoft
- Developer: Microsoft
- Release: 1992 as Microsoft Windows 3.1 for Pen Computing 1.0
- Stable release: Microsoft Windows 95 for Pen Computing 2.0 / 1995
- Operating system: Microsoft Windows
- License: Proprietary

Windows for Pen Computing is a software suite for Windows 3.1x, that Microsoft designed to incorporate pen computing capabilities into the Windows operating system. Windows for Pen Computing was the second major pen computing platform for x86 tablet PCs; GO Corporation released their operating system, PenPoint OS, shortly before Microsoft published Windows for Pen Computing 1.0 in 1992.

The software features of Windows for Pen Computing 1.0 includes an on-screen keyboard, a notepad program for writing with the stylus, and a program for training the system to respond accurately to the user's handwriting. Microsoft included Windows for Pen Computing 1.0 in the Windows SDK, and the operating environment was also bundled with compatible devices.

Microsoft published Windows 95 in 1995, and later released Pen Services for Windows 95, also known as Windows for Pen Computing 2.0, for this new operating system. Windows XP Tablet PC Edition superseded Windows for Pen Computing in 2002. Subsequent Windows versions, such as Windows Vista and Windows 7, supported pen computing intrinsically.

== System requirements ==
The official system requirements for Windows 3.1 and subsequent versions include the following:

Minimum system requirements
	Windows 3.1	Modular Windows	Windows for Workgroups
CPU	80286 processor for standard mode, 80386 for enhanced mode	80386 processor	386SX processor
RAM	1 MB of memory (640 KB of conventional memory)	4 MB of memory	3 MB of memory (640 KB of conventional memory)
Storage	A hard disk with at least 6.5 MB of free space (8 MB for enhanced mode users), and at least one floppy disk drive	A hard disk with at least 20 MB of free space	A hard disk with at least 8 MB of free space (14 MB needed for a complete installation), and at least one floppy disk drive
Video	VGA adapter	VGA-NTSC adapter	VGA adapter
Network	Optional hardware includes a Hayes, MultiTech, TrailBlazer, or any other compatible modem if user wants to connect to a network		An adapter card with Network Device Interface Specification (NDIS) driver, optional hardware includes a Hayes, MultiTech, TrailBlazer, or any other compatible modem
OS	MS-DOS 3.1	MS-DOS 3.22 and Windows 3.1	MS-DOS 3.3 (computers that act as servers require MS-DOS 5.0 or higher)
Mouse	A Microsoft-compatible pointing device is recommended, but not required.		

To use a printer or to run Windows on a network, additional 2.5 MB of free space will be needed on the hard drive. The amount of RAM is dependent on software that runs on the PC; if the user is on the network and if the network requires a lot of memory, more RAM will be needed. Windows 3.1 includes more drivers for printers than its predecessor. It is also possible to connect to a network using Windows 3.1 via Hayes, Multi-Tech, or Trail Blazer modems.

== Reception ==
Windows 3.1 is considered to be more stable and multimedia-friendly in comparison to its predecessor, while its user interface was reinvigorated. It has been shown as an improvement, and it possesses more features in comparison with its rival IBM OS/2 2.0, which launched a month earlier than Windows 3.1. Chris Pratley of Microsoft recalled in 2004 that "Windows 3.1 (and then Windows for Workgroups 3.11) came out, fixed up a lot of rough edges [on Windows 3.0], and made a workable GUI system that ran on top of DOS". InfoWorld rated the operating system a "very good" value.

PC Magazine said in 1993, that accounting software vendors that two years earlier scoffed at Windows compatibility, "are stumbling over each other in their rush to get to market with a Windows product before the competition". Naming Intellisoft's Accounting Vision/32 — the only Windows-based product among the 11 LAN-based packages it evaluated — an Editor's Choice, the magazine concluded that its power and flexibility "should lay to rest any lingering doubts about the suitability of the Windows environment for accounting". PC Magazine wrote in 1994, that small business accounting software for Windows had substantially fewer features than DOS counterparts: "A potentially serious problem with all Windows applications, accounting packages included", the magazine added, was "the frequency of system crashes—especially when running several applications simultaneously". "The trickle that began two years ago is now a flood: LAN-based Windows accounting systems are here in force", PC said in 1995 when again evaluating the industry. While the transition was more difficult and slower than expected, every major vendor of multiuser accounting software had some Windows products available, while spending "near zero" on DOS products. Customers' costs also rose, with Great Plains Software raising prices by up to 25%, and the magazine recommending 80486 or Pentium-based computers for the new products.

Windows for Workgroups received lukewarm reception; it has been praised for its technical design, but it has been also noted as a "business disappointment" due to low sales.

Regarding the marketplace, Windows 3.1 received an enthusiastic reception; its retail price sat at $149, and over three million copies of Windows 3.1 were sold in the first three months. The year of Windows 3.1's release was successful for Microsoft, which was named the "Most Innovative Company Operating in the U.S." by Fortune magazine, while Windows became the most widely used GUI-based operating system.

Microsoft ended its support for Windows 3.1 and Windows for Workgroups on December 31, 2001, although the embedded version of Windows for Workgroups 3.11 was retired on November 1, 2008. The operating system was superseded by Windows NT 3.1, which was released in 1993, and Windows 95 in 1995.

=== DR-DOS compatibility ===
The installer of the beta release used code that checked whether it was running on Microsoft-licensed DOS or another DOS operating system, such as DR-DOS. It was known as AARD code, and Microsoft disabled it before the final release of Windows 3.1, though without removing it altogether. Digital Research, who owned DR-DOS, released a patch within weeks to allow the installer to continue. Memos that were released during the United States v. Microsoft Corp. antitrust case in 1999 revealed that Microsoft specifically focused it on DR-DOS. When Caldera bought DR-DOS from Novell, they brought a lawsuit against Microsoft over the AARD code, which was later settled with Microsoft paying $280 million.

=== Legacy ===
Windows 3.1 found a niche market as an embedded operating system after becoming obsolete in the PC world. By 2008, both Virgin Atlantic and Qantas employed it for some of the onboard entertainment systems on long-distance jets. It also sees continued use as an embedded OS in retail cash tills. On July 14, 2013, Linux kernel version 3.11 was officially named "Linux for Workgroups" as a tongue-in-cheek reference to Windows for Workgroups 3.11.

In November 2015, the failure of a Windows 3.1 system in Orly Airport in Paris, which was responsible for communicating visual range information in foggy weather to pilots, made operations temporarily cease. Whether the failure was hardware- or software-based is not specified, though the highlighting of the operating system suggests a software failure. In 2016, the Internet Archive organization released Windows 3.1 as an emulated environment in a web browser.

In January 2024, German state-owned national railway company Deutsche Bahn posted a job listing for a system administrator with "knowledge of legacy operating systems". The main responsibilities listed in the post were maintenance of the old system and driver updates. The need for the continued use of Windows 3.11 could apparently be traced back to Siemens' SIBAS (Siemens Bahn Automatisierungs System) automation system used to control trains. The job post was retracted due to "unfortunate wording".

== See also ==
- History of Microsoft Windows
- Windows NT, the technology behind Windows NT 3.1.
- Windows 9x, the technology behind Windows 3.1's successor Windows 95
