= Mouse keys =

Feature of some graphical user interfaces that uses the keyboard as a pointing device

Mouse keys is a feature of some graphical user interfaces that uses the keyboard (especially numeric keypad) as a pointing device (usually replacing a mouse). Its roots lie in the earliest days of visual editors when line and column navigation was controlled with arrow keys. Today, mouse keys usually refers to the numeric keypad layout standardized with the introduction of the X Window System in 1984.

== Layout ==
X window system MouseKeys default numpad layout

key	action
Num Lock	with Alt+⇧ Shift enable/disable MouseKeys
8	cursor up
2	cursor down
6	cursor right
4	cursor left
7	cursor up and left
9	cursor up and right
3	cursor down and right
1	cursor down and left
/	select primary button
*	select modifier button
-	select alternate button
5	click selected button
+	double click selected button
0	depress selected button
.	release selected button
↵ Enter	enter key

== History ==
Historically, MouseKeys supported GUI programs when many terminals had no dedicated pointing device. As pointing devices became ubiquitous, the use of mouse keys narrowed to situations where a pointing device was missing, unusable, or inconvenient. Such situations may arise from the following:

- precision requirements (e.g., technical drawing)
- disabled user or ergonomics issues
- environmental limits (e.g., vibration in car or plane)
- broken/missing/unavailable equipment

In 1987, Macintosh Operating System 4.2 Easy Access provided MouseKeys support to all applications. Easy access was (de)activated by clicking the ⇧ Shift key five times.

By the early 2020s, with graphics tablets becoming more common, a configuration change may be required before enabling MouseKeys.

== MouseKeysAccel ==
X window system MouseKeysAccel trajectory

parameter	meaning
mk_delay	milliseconds between the initial key press and first repeated motion event
mk_interval	milliseconds between repeated motion events
mk_max_speed	steady speed (in action_delta units) applied each event
mk_time_to_max	number of events (count) accelerating to steady speed
mk_curve	ramp used to reach maximum pointer speed

The X Window System MouseKeysAccel control applies action (usually cursor movement) repeatedly while a direction key {1,2,3,4,6,7,8,9} remains depressed. When the key is depressed, an action_delta is immediately applied. If the key remains depressed, longer than mk_delay milliseconds, some action is applied every mk_interval milliseconds until the key is released. If the key remains depressed, after more than mk_time_to_max actions have been applied, action_delta magnified mk_max_speed times, is applied every mk_interval milliseconds.

The first mk_time_to_max actions increase smoothly according to an exponential.

$\mathrm{action\_delta} \times \mathrm{mk\_max\_speed} \times \left( \frac{ i } { \mathrm{mk\_time\_to\_max} } \right) ^{\frac{ 1000 + \mathrm{mk\_curve} } { 1000 }}$

mk_curve	result
-1000	uniform speed, linearly increasing action
0	uniform acceleration, linearly increasing speed
1000	uniform jerk, linearly increasing acceleration

These five parameters are configurable.

== Enabling ==
Under the X Window Systems X.Org and XFree86 used on Unix-like systems such as Linux, BSD, and AIX, MouseKeys (and MouseKeysAccel), when available, is nominally (de)activated by Alt+⇧ Shift+Num Lock. MouseKeys without acceleration (also known as plot mode) is sometimes available with ⇧ Shift+Num Lock. This is nominally independent of the window manager in use, but may be overridden, or even made unavailable by a configuration file.

Before enabling, it may be necessary to change system configuration. The setxkbmap utility can be used to change the configuration under Xorg:

setxkbmap -option keypad:pointerkeys

There are also various utilities to allow more precise control via user-configurable key bindings, such as xmousekeys and xdotool.

Since KDE 5, MouseKeys is enabled and configured by systemsetting5 (Hardware → Input Devices → Mouse → Keyboard Navigation)

MouseKeys for Apple Inc.'s macOS is enabled and configured via the Accessibility ([apple] → System Preferences → Accessibility → Mouse & Trackpad).

Microsoft changed the method of enabling between Windows 2000, Windows XP (added diagonal cursor movement and MouseKeysAccel), and Windows Vista.

== Common usage ==
=== Replacing the mouse keys ===
Replacing the mouse keys by the numeric keypad is as follows:

Typing 5 (with the numeric keypad) is equivalent to clicking the selected button. By default, the selected button is the primary button (nominally under index finger, left button for most right-handed people and right button for most left-handed people). Typing - (with the numeric keypad) selects the alternate button (nominally under ring finger, right button for most right-handed people and left button for most left-handed people). Typing * (with the numeric keypad) selects the modifier button (nominally under the middle finger, middle button of a 3-button mouse). Typing / (with the numeric keypad) selects the primary button. The selection remains in effect until a different button is selected.

Assignment of left/middle/right button to primary/modifier/alternate, alternate/modifier/primary, or something else is settable by many means. Some mice have a switch, that swaps assignment of right and left keys. Many laptop bioses have a setting for mouse button assignment. Many window managers have a setting that permutes the assignment. Within the X Window System core protocol, permutation can be applied by xmodmap.

=== Moving the pointer by keys ===
Other than 5, all other numeric keys from the numeric keypad are used to move the pointer on the screen. For example, 8 will move the pointer upwards, while 1 will move it diagonally downwards to the left.

== See also ==
- FilterKeys – Accessibility feature of Microsoft Windows
- Sticky keys – Accessibility feature
- ToggleKeys – Accessibility function for Microsoft Windows
- Virtual keyboard – Software component
