= FLD =

FLD may refer to:

== Politics ==
- Federalists and Liberal Democrats, a former political party in Italy
- Front for the Liberation of Djibouti
- Liberal Democratic Foundation (Italian: Fondazione Liberaldemocratica), a former political party in Italy

== Places ==
- Fauldhouse railway station (rail station code: FLD), in Scotland, UK
- Fond du Lac County Airport (IATA airport code: FLD; ICAO airport code: KFLD), in Wisconsin, USA
- Fld. (Field), a street suffix

== Medicine ==
- Farmer's lung disease
- Fatty liver disease
- Fazio–Londe disease

== Other uses ==
- Fast Lane Daily, a video podcast
- Ferroelectric liquid crystal display
- Fisher's linear discriminant, a method used in statistics
- Forming limit diagram, a diagram used in material science and metallurgy to predict sheet-forming behavior
- Free Lunch Design, a Swedish videogame developer, a subsidiary of Palringo

== See also ==
- FLDS
- Field (disambiguation)
- Fluid (disambiguation)
