= Stop Tony Meow =

Browser extension

- Stop Tony Meow in use on the ABC website
- Developers: Dan Nolan, Ben Taylor, Matt Kelsh
- Written in: Javascript
- Platform: Chrome, Safari, Firefox
- Type: Humour
- Website: web.archive.org/web/20201125200053/http://www.stoptonymeow.com/

Stop Tony Meow is a discontinued browser extension which replaces photos of former Australian prime minister Tony Abbott with images of cats and kittens on websites. Initially created for Google Chrome, the extension was expanded to Safari and Firefox later in 2014. The extension was created by developers and designers Dan Nolan, Ben Taylor and Matt Kelsh.

The extension became very popular with over 100,000 users by September 2014, and in the same year it was selected by the National Library of Australia to be included in its Pandora Archive.

== Functions ==
The script searches for "abbott" in a page's source code and replaces the image with a photo from Placekitten, a service which displays placeholder cat images on websites. In response to the popularity of Stop Tony Meow, the Liberal Party changed their website to prevent images of their then-leader being replaced.

Stop Tony Meow also gained limited notoriety in Texas, where it was discovered that the extension also replaced images of then-Republican gubernatorial candidate, now-governor Greg Abbott.

== Freedom of information request ==
Curious to read what the prime minister and government thought of the software, Nolan lodged a freedom of information request for any documents containing the words "Stop Tony Meow" with the Department of Prime Minister and Cabinet. Speaking to The Sydney Morning Herald, Nolan stated, "it would be fascinating to see how a government department reacts to these weird new kinds of technology and culture jamming stuff, which previously they wouldn't have had to deal with."

A search produced over 137 pages of correspondence, for which Nolan was charged $720.30. The fee was not paid and so the documents were not released. Nolan challenged the cost with the department, arguing that the documents were in the public interest, but the request was denied. Nolan later considered fundraising among friends to access the documents.
