= Streamus =

- Developer(s): Sean Anderson
- Initial release: February 11, 2014; 11 years ago
- Available in: English
- License: Apache License
- Website: streamus.com

Streamus is a discontinued open-source Chrome extension that acted as a music player for YouTube, allowing users to listen to YouTube videos as music without having YouTube open.

== Features ==
Streamus features include the ability to search for YouTube videos and create playlists, keyboard shortcuts, Beatport integration, and Omnibox integration. Omnibox integration allows users to search using Streamus with the URL address bar, by typing "Streamus" and hitting tab.

== Shutdown ==
On July 13, 2015, after four months of intense negotiation, Sean announced that due to difficulty meeting YouTube's API guidelines, the extension would be removed from the Chrome Web Store the following day. The reason and the entire email conversation with the YouTube team was made public by the author through his extension app.

== See also ==
- Web application
