= Fluid (disambiguation) =

A fluid is a substance that continually deforms (flows) under an applied shear stress.

Fluid may also refer to:

== Arts, entertainment and media ==
- "Fluid" (Lil' Fizz song), 2006
- Fluid (video game), a game for the Sony PlayStation
- The Fluid, an American rock band
- Fluid, an English rock band of guitarist Patrick Walden

== Computing ==
- Fluid (web browser), a WebKit-based site-specific browser for Mac OS X
- Fluid Framework, computer platform for real-time collaboration across applications by Microsoft
- FLUID, a user interface design program

== Finance ==
- Fluid balance transfer credit cards, issued by NewDay Ltd
