= Fluid (web browser) =

WebKit2-based site-specific browser (SSB) for Mac OS X

- The English Wikipedia website displayed in a minimalist -configured site-specific browser window created by Fluid.
- Original author: Todd Ditchendorf
- Release: December 9, 2007
- Written in: Objective-C
- Operating system: Mac OS X
- Platform: WebKit, Cocoa
- Type: Site-specific browser
- License: Proprietary freeware with open-source components
- Website: fluidapp.com

Fluid is a WebKit2-based site-specific browser (SSB) for Mac OS X created by Todd Ditchendorf. Its original WebKit-based version was compared to Mozilla Prism and mentioned in Lifehacker, TechCrunch, 43 Folders, the 37 Signals blog, and on InfoWorld as a way to make web applications more like native desktop applications.

== 1.0 milestone ==
On May 1, 2011, Fluid 1.0 was released with a completely new codebase. Fluid Apps created with previous versions of Fluid cannot be updated via software update and SSBs have to be re-created with Fluid 1.0 (to transition to version 1.0 and later). While version 1.0 is still a free app, a Fluid License can be purchased which will unlock extra features (some previously included by default in previous versions). On July 4, 2011, version 1.2 was released and featured compatibility with Mac OS X 10.7 Lion.

== 2.0 milestone ==
In July 2018, Fluid underwent another rewrite to take advantage of Apple's newer WebKit2 API with process separation, with the same licensing terms as 1.x versions. Subsequent minor versions restored feature support and added support for Dark Mode. The latest version was 2.1.2 which was released in October 2018.
