= Mozilla Prism =

Former free software entity

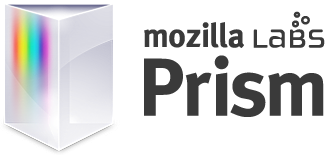
- Mozilla Prism Icon
- Developers: Mozilla Corporation, Mozilla Foundation
- Preview release: 1.0b4 / May 5, 2010; 15 years ago
- Written in: C++, XUL, XBL, JavaScript
- Operating system: Cross-platform
- Platform: Gecko
- License: MPL, GPL, LGPL
- Website: prism.mozilla.com Official Site (Offline)

Mozilla Prism (formerly WebRunner) is a discontinued project which integrated web applications with the desktop, allowing web applications to be launched from the desktop and configured independently of the default web browser. As of November 2010, Prism is listed as an inactive project at the Mozilla labs website.

Prism is based on a concept called a site-specific browser (SSB). An SSB is designed to work exclusively with one web application. It does not have the menus, toolbars and other parts of a traditional web browser.

The software is built upon XULRunner, so it is possible to get some Mozilla Firefox extensions to work in it.

The preview announcement of Prism was made in October 2007.

On February 1, 2011, Mozilla Labs announced it would no longer maintain Prism, its ideas having been subsumed into a newer project called Chromeless. However, the Mozilla Labs mailing list revealed that Chromeless is not in fact a replacement for Prism, and there is currently no Mozilla replacement for the out-of-the-box site-specific browser functionality of Prism, Chromeless instead being a platform for developers rather than users. For a while Prism continued to be maintained under the original name of WebRunner, which then also was discontinued in September 2011.

== See also ==
- Chromium Embedded Framework
- Site-specific browser
- Rich Internet application
- Fluid (web browser)
