= Mobile browser =

Web browser designed for use on mobile devices

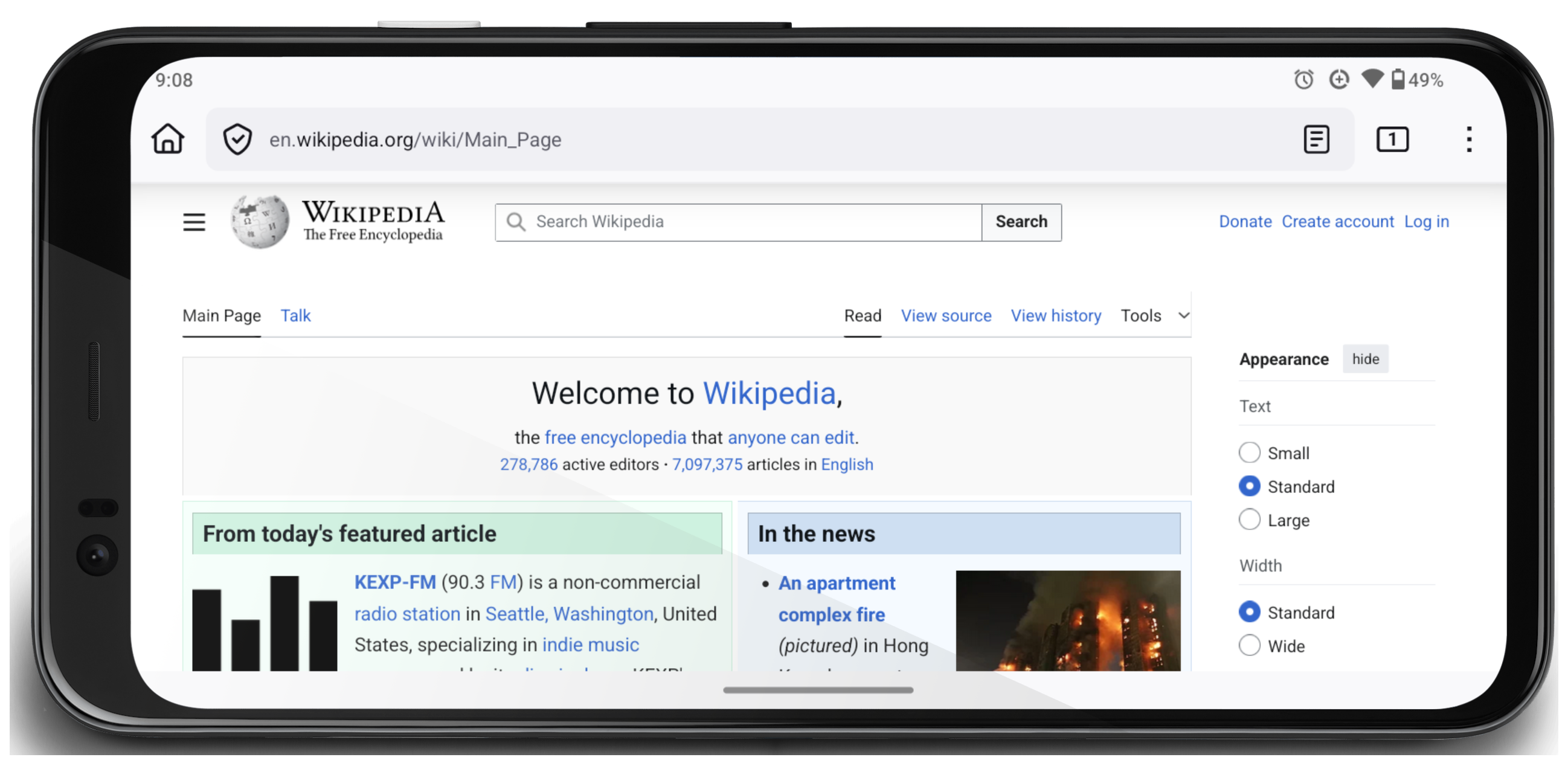
A Wikipedia page on an Android phone displayed on the Firefox web browser

A mobile browser is a web browser designed for use on a mobile device such as a mobile phone, PDA, smartphone, or tablet. Mobile browsers are optimized to display web content most effectively on small screens on portable devices. Some mobile browsers, especially older versions, are designed to be small and efficient to accommodate the low memory capacity and low bandwidth of certain wireless handheld devices. Traditional smaller feature phones use stripped-down mobile web browsers; however, most current smartphones have full-fledged browsers that can handle the latest web technologies, such as CSS 3, JavaScript, and Ajax.

Websites designed to be usable in mobile browsers may be collectively referred to as the mobile web. Today, over 75% of websites are "mobile friendly", by detecting when a request comes from a mobile device and automatically creating a "mobile" version of the page, designed to fit the device's screen and be usable with a touch interface.

== Underlying technology ==
The mobile browser usually connects via the cellular network, or increasingly via Wireless LAN, using standard HTTP over TCP/IP and displays web pages written in HTML. Historically, early feature phones were restricted to only displaying pages specifically designed for mobile use, written in XHTML Mobile Profile (WAP 2.0), or WML (which evolved from HDML). WML and HDML are stripped-down formats suitable for transmission across limited bandwidth, and wireless data connection called WAP. In Japan, DoCoMo defined the i-mode service based on i-mode HTML, which is an extension of Compact HTML (C-HTML), a simple subset of HTML.

WAP 2.0 specifies XHTML Mobile Profile plus WAP CSS, subsets of the W3C's standard XHTML and CSS with minor mobile extensions.

Smartphone mobile browsers are full-featured Web browsers capable of HTML, CSS, ECMAScript, as well as mobile technologies such as WML, i-mode HTML, or cHTML. To accommodate small screens, they use Post-WIMP interfaces.

== History ==
The first mobile browser for a PDA was PocketWeb for the Apple Newton created at TecO in 1994, followed by the first commercial product NetHopper released in August 1996.

The so-called "microbrowser" technologies such as WAP, NTTDocomo's i-mode platform and Openwave's HDML platform fueled the first wave of interest in wireless data services.

The first deployment of a mobile browser on a mobile phone was probably in 1997 when Unwired Planet (later to become Openwave) put their "UP.Browser" on AT&T handsets to give users access to HDML content.

A British company, STNC Ltd., developed a mobile browser (HitchHiker) in 1997 that was intended to present the entire device UI. The demonstration platform for this mobile browser (Webwalker) had 1 MIPS total processing power. This was a single core platform, running the GSM stack on the same processor as the application stack. In 1999 STNC was acquired by Microsoft and HitchHiker became Microsoft Mobile Explorer 2.0, not related to the primitive Microsoft Mobile Explorer 1.0. HitchHiker is believed to be the first mobile browser with a unified rendering model, handling HTML and WAP along with ECMAScript, WMLScript, POP3 and IMAP mail in a single client. Although it was not used, it was possible to combine HTML and WAP in the same pages although this would render the pages invalid for any other device. Mobile Explorer 2.0 was available on the Benefon Q, Sony CMD-Z5, CMD-J5, CMD-MZ5, CMD-J6, CMD-Z7, CMD-J7 and CMD-J70. With the addition of a messaging kernel and a driver model, this was powerful enough to be the operating system for certain embedded devices. One such device was the Amstrad e-m@iler and e-m@iler 2. This code formed the basis for MME3.

Multiple companies offered browsers for the Palm OS platform. The first HTML browser for Palm OS 1.0 was HandWeb by Smartcode software, released in 1997. HandWeb included its own TCP/IP stack, and Smartcode was acquired by Palm in 1999. Mobile browsers for the Palm OS platform multiplied after the release of Palm OS 2.0, which included a TCP/IP stack. A freeware (although later shareware) browser for the Palm OS was Palmscape, written in 1998 by Kazuho Oku in Japan, who went on to found Ilinx. It was still in limited use as late as 2003. Qualcomm also developed the Eudora Web browser, and launched it with the Palm OS based QCP smartphone. ProxiWeb was a proxy-based Web browsing solution, developed by Ian Goldberg and others at the University of California, Berkeley and later acquired by PumaTech.

Released in 2001, Mobile Explorer 3.0 added iMode compatibility (cHTML) plus numerous proprietary schemes. By imaginatively combining these proprietary schemes with WAP protocols, MME3.0 implemented OTA database synchronisation, push email, push information clients (not unlike a 'Today Screen') and PIM functionality. The cancelled Sony Ericsson CMD-Z700 was to feature heavy integration with MME3.0. Although Mobile Explorer was ahead of its time in the mobile phone space, development was stopped in 2002.

Also in 2002, Palm, Inc. offered Web Pro on Tungsten PDAs based upon a Novarra browser. PalmSource offered a competing Web browser based on Access NetFront.

Opera software pioneered with its Small Screen Rendering and Medium Screen Rendering technology. The Opera web browser is able to reformat regular web pages for optimal fit on small screens and medium-sized (PDA) screens. It was also the first widely available mobile browser to support Ajax and the first mobile browser to pass the Acid2 test.

Distinct from a mobile browser is a web-based emulator, which uses a "Virtual Handset" to display WAP pages on a computer screen, implemented either in Java or as an HTML transcoder.

== Popular mobile browsers ==
The following are some of the more popular mobile browsers. Some mobile browsers are really miniaturized web browsers, so some mobile device providers also provide browsers for desktop and laptop computers.

Usage share of mobile (smartphone and tablet) browsers
Source	Date	Android Browser	Chrome	Internet Explorer	Safari	Opera Mini	UC Browser	Samsung Browser	Huawei Browser
StatCounter	May 2022	1.14%	64.23%	--	25.24%	1.68%	1.21%	4.65%	--
StatCounter	June 2017	4.24%	47.26%	0.59%	21.17%	5.01%	14.16%	6.03%	1.09%
StatCounter	June 2015	15.81%	30.67%	1.76%	24.64%	10.37%	12.95%	--	3.79%
NetApplications	June 2014	22.77%	16.67%	2.01%	47.06%	7.82%	--	--	4.69%

=== Default browsers for mobile and tablet (current and defunct) ===
Browser	Creator	Current browser engine	Software license	Notes
Amazon Silk	Amazon	Blink	Proprietary and LGPL	Uses split architecture whereby all processing is performed on Amazon's servers
Huawei browser	Huawei	WebKit	Proprietary and LGPL	Browser included with EMUI version 10.0 to version 14.2 and Harmony OS version 2.0 to version 4.2.
Android browser	Google	WebKit	BSD and LGPL	Browser included with Android version 1.5 to version 4.1
BlackBerry Browser	BlackBerry	Mango (ver 4.5, 4.6, 4.7, 5.0); WebKit (ver 6.0+)	Proprietary and LGPL	-
Blazer	Palm	NetFront	Proprietary	Installed on all newer Palm Treos and PDAs. Now discontinued.
Chrome	Google	WebKit, Blink (versions 28+)	Freeware under Google Chrome Terms of Service, but uses components from the Chromium (web browser) project.	Installed as default on Google devices shipping with Android versions 4.1 (Jelly Bean) or higher
Clipper	Palm	Custom	Proprietary	Installed on Palm VII series devices, or via Palm's Mobile Internet Kit
Dolphin Browser	MoboTap	WebKit	Proprietary	Installed on all Bada
Firefox for Mobile	Mozilla	Gecko, WebKit (iOS version only)	MPL	Currently released for Android and iOS, but default browser for Firefox OS devices
Internet Explorer Mobile	Microsoft	MSHTML	Proprietary	Now discontinued
Iris Browser	Torch Mobile	WebKit	Proprietary and LGPL	Acquired by Research in Motion - No longer supports Windows Mobile or Linux
Kindle web browser	Amazon	NetFront	Proprietary	Labeled "experimental"
Microsoft Edge [Legacy]	Microsoft	EdgeHTML	Proprietary	On Windows 10 Mobile
Myriad Browser	Myriad Group	Magellan (ver. 6.x); Fugu (ver 7.x); WebKit (ver 9)	Proprietary and LGPL	Acquired from Openwave in 2008
NetFront	ACCESS	NetFront	Proprietary	-
Nokia Series 40 Browser	Nokia	WebKit	Proprietary and LGPL	
Openwave	Unwired Planet	Proprietary	Proprietary	HDML, WAP, WML
Opera Mini	Opera	Presto	Proprietary	Capable of pre-processing web pages and formatting for small screens
Opera Mobile	Opera	Presto, Blink (versions 15+)	Proprietary	Capable of reading HTML and can reformat for small screens
PlayStation Portable web browser	Sony	NetFront	Proprietary	-
Polaris Browser	Infraware Inc.	Lumi (Ver. 6.x); WebKit (Ver. 7.x)	Proprietary and LGPL	Nokia, Samsung, Kyocera and other phones sold in the United States, China, South Korea, etc.
QQ browser	Tencent	WebKit, MSHTML	Proprietary	
S60 web browser	Nokia	WebKit	LGPL	On S60 phones (predominantly Nokia). Now discontinued.
Safari	Apple	WebKit (WebCore)	Proprietary and LGPL	On iOS (iPhone, iPod Touch and iPad)
Skyfire Mobile Browser	Skyfire	WebKit	Proprietary and LGPL	Discontinued on 2014
WebOS Browser	Palm	WebKit	Proprietary and LGPL	The last WebOS, 3.0.5, was released on January 12, 2012
Iodé Browser	IodéOS technologies	Gecko	MPL	On IodéOS. Based on Firefox. Telemetry removed and trackers removed.
Browser	Creator	Current browser engine	Software license	Notes

=== User-installable mobile browsers (current and defunct) ===
Browser	Creator	Current browser engine	Platforms	Software license	Notes
360 Web Browser	Digital Poke		iOS		
BOLT browser	Bitstream	WebKit	Java ME, BlackBerry	Proprietary	Discontinued December 2011
Brave	Brave	Blink	iOS, Android	Open-source	Privacy-focused, built on Chromium.
Cốc Cốc	Cốc Cốc	Blink	iOS, Android	Proprietary	
Cake Browser	Cake Technologies, Inc.	WebKit	iOS, Android		Swipeable mobile browser created in 2018
Google Chrome	Google	Blink, V8, WebKit (iOS)	Android, iOS	Proprietary under Google Chrome Terms of Service	
Chromium	Google	Blink, V8	Android, Linux	BSD-3 and others	Primary code-base of Chrome.
Classilla	Cameron Kaiser	Clecko (modified Gecko)	Mac OS 8.6, Mac OS 9	MPL/GPL/LGPL	Although desktop, uses a mobile user agent by default due to the older machines it services.
Deepfish	Microsoft		Windows Mobile	Proprietary	Proxy-rendering browser (discontinued)
Dolphin Browser	MoboTap	WebKit	Android, iOS		
DuckDuckGo	DuckDuckGo	Blink, WebKit (iOS)	Android, iOS	Apache 2.0	
Firefox for mobile	Mozilla	Gecko, WebKit (iOS)	Android, Firefox OS (discontinued), iOS	MPL	Includes HTML5 support, Firefox Sync, add-ons support and tabbed browsing.
Firefox Focus/Klar	Mozilla	Gecko, WebKit (iOS)	Android, iOS	MPL 2.0	
GNU IceCat	GNU Project	Gecko	Android, Linux	MPL 2.0, GPLv3+	
JioSphere	Jio	WebKit, Blink	Android	Proprietary	
Links	Twibright Labs		PlayStation Portable	GPL	Unofficial port, requires custom firmware
Mercury Browser	iLegendSoft, Inc.		Android, iOS	Proprietary	
Micromax Browser	Micromax Informatics		Android		
Minimo	Mozilla Foundation	Gecko	Linux, Windows CE	MPL/GPL/LGPL	Discontinued
NetFront	ACCESS	NetFront, WebKit	Linux, S60, BREW, Android, Windows Mobile, others	Proprietary	
Opera Mini	Opera	Presto	Java ME, Android, Windows Mobile, iOS, BlackBerry, S60, others	Proprietary	Supports most features of stand-alone Opera, but can run on less capable phones by offloading memory-intensive rendering to proxy server (based on Opera Mobile running on a server)
Opera Mobile	Opera	Presto, Blink	Android, Maemo, BREW, S60, Windows Mobile		From version 14 it is based on Chromium.
Pale Moon	Moonchild Productions		Android	Proprietary	Built on Firefox code
Pixo	Sun Microsystems				
QQ browser	Tencent	WebKit, MSHTML	Windows, Mac OS X, Android, iOS	Proprietary	
Skweezer					
Skyfire	Skyfire Labs, Inc.	WebKit (ver 2.x+), Gecko (ver 1.x)	Android, iOS		Supports Flash and Ajax. As of December 2010, it no longer supports Symbian OS or Windows Mobile
Sleipnir	Fenrir Inc	WebKit	Android, iOS, Windows Mobile		
Steel		WebKit	Android		Discontinued
Teashark			Java ME	Proprietary	
Tor Browser	The Tor Project, Guardian Project	Gecko	Android, Linux	MPL 2.0	
UC Browser	UC Mobile	U3 (based on WebKit)	S60, Java ME, Android, iOS, Windows Mobile, Bada	Proprietary	Proxy-rendering in Java and Symbian. U3 engine in Android.
Vision Mobile Browser	Novarra		Java ME, BREW	Proprietary	
Vivaldi	Vivaldi Technologies	Blink, V8	Android, Linux, iOS	BSD-3, Proprietary	
WinWAP	Winwap Technologies		Windows Mobile	Proprietary	
Arc	The Browser Company	WebKit	iOS	Proprietary	
IronFox			Android	Open-source	
Fennec			Android	Open-source	
Foss Browser			Android	Open-source	
Browser	Creator	Current browser engine	Platforms	Software license	Notes

=== Mobile HTML transcoders ===
Mobile transcoders reformat and compress web content for mobile devices and must be used in conjunction with built-in or user-installed mobile browsers. The following are several leading mobile transcoding services.

- Openwave Web Adapter - used by Vodacom
- Vision Mobile Server
- Skweezer - used by Orange, Etisalat, JumpTap, Medio, Miva, and others
- Opera Mini

==== Defunct transcoders or sites with removed transcoding functionality ====
- Smartphone site — The last extant snapshot of the site is from 5 September 2012.
- Device-Browser combinations on Cloud
- Finch — The last snapshot of a functional Finch site is from 28 February 2009. This defunct service should not be confused with Finch (software). Finch the transcoder became Squeezr!Beta as early as 8 December 2009.
  - Squeezr!Beta — The last functional Squeezr!Beta page is dated 13 February 2010. As of 28 August 2010, Squeezr!Beta had closed; the last page of Squeezr as authored by Adam Brenecki is dated 2 January 2012. Since 2013, squeezr.net redirected to squeezr.it, which is a different service, and not related to Adam Brenecki.
- Microsoft Bing — the option to enable or disable "Optimize web pages for your phone" in "Search settings" is not visible in Bing's mobile version as of March 2018. (The mobile version can be accessed with a phone or tablet, or when setting a web browser to identify itself with a mobile-based user agent string.)
- MobileLeap Transcoding Engine, by MobileLeap Inc. As of March 2018, web page source code includes JavaScript from the domain parking company Sedo) — The site would not allow entry without a cookie, so a typical crawler would be redirected to mlvb's cookiecheck page, the last snapshot of which is from 12 October 2017.
- Mowser (mowser.com) — Alternately marketed with the mowser.mobi domain name, which is now a permanent deadlink. The last snapshot of a working page is dated 22 September 2017. As of 30 March 2018, the site has been shut down.

== See also ==
- Browser wars
- Device Description Repository
- i-mode
- Information appliance
- Mobile web
- Mobile content
- Usage share of web browsers
- User agent
- Web Compatibility Test for Mobile Browsers
