= Vision Mobile Browser =

Web browser

Vision
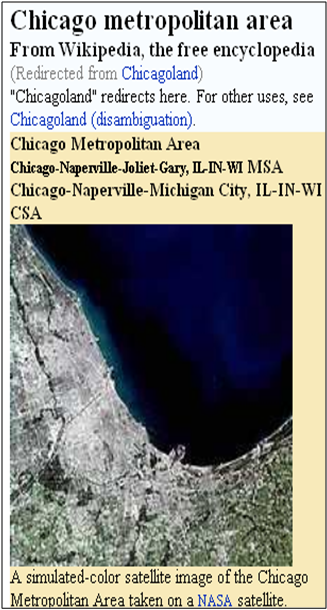
- Vision Browser Screenshot
- Developer(s): Novarra Inc.
- Initial release: October 2002
- Stable release: 8.00 / 2009; 16 years ago
- Operating system: cross-platform
- Type: Microbrowser
- License: Proprietary

Vision (formerly nWeb) was a mobile browser developed by Novarra Inc. that ran on Java Platform, Micro Edition. It was first released in 2002, and the final release was in 2009.

== Functionality ==
Mobile phone users can access and use the same web sites on their wireless handsets that they visit using personal computers. Full web pages load in seconds due to compression and in-network processing of content by the server.

Content Type Support: “Street” HTML, HTML 4.01, XHTML 1.0, XHTML Basic, XHTML MP, cHTML, HDML, WML 1.1, Cascading Style Sheets v1, CSS v2, W-CSS, Tables, Frames, Forms, JavaScript 1.5, ECMAScript v3, ECMAScript Mobile Profile, HTTP cookies, Basic Authentication, gzip, Multi-Part MIME, GIF, Animated GIF, JPEG, BMP file format, WBMP

Multimedia Support: Adobe Flash, FLV, WMV, AVI, MPEG-2/MPEG-4, 3GP, 3GP2, MP3, SVG Tiny, SMIL, MIDI (supported on handsets with appropriate APIs)

Network Protocols and Security: HTTP1.1, HTTPS, SSL 2.0/3.0, WTLS, Certificates

Push: WAP 2.0 Push Access Protocol (PAP)

Download: OMA Download 1.0, MIDP OTA 1.0 & 2.0

== Features ==
- On-Device Portal: Locally store pages with categories and sites that can be predefined by the service provider and updated over the air, also "History" and "Favorites" can be customized by the end user
- PC View: Site pages load with a visual representation of the full web page.
- Fit to Screen View: Choice of reformatted layout with image sizes adapted to fit within the width of the phone's screen.
- Content Prioritization and Mobile Navigation Aids: The browser attempts to automatically find the main information on a web page and focus on that content. Additionally, a user can “jump to” other prioritized content such as login, search or forms.
- Adobe Flash and Streaming Video (Streaming media): The browser adapts Flash animations, Flash video, and other video formats to a format supported by the handset (usually RTSP/3GPP).
- RSS: Users can view or subscribe to an available RSS feed on a site.
- Widget engine: Ability to run widgets on mobile handsets.
