= MoPilot =

- Company logo

- Logo as on mobile site in WBMP format
- Website type: WAP portal
- Predecessor: wapmap.com
- Owner: WAP4.com
- Website: mopilot.com; my.mopilot.com
- Commercial: Yes
- Launched: 2000

MoPilot (also styled mopilot or mopilot.com) was a mobile website and portal designed for wireless application protocol (WAP) devices. It provided entertainment and communication tools optimised for the limited capabilities of early mobile devices and of early mobile web technologies.

MoPilot was developed by WAP4.com as a successor and extension of their search engine WapMap.com. The site was launched in 2000.

== Features ==
The MoPilot platform offered interactive features designed for WAP-enabled devices. It hosted downloadable content such as mobile games and applications, as well as online competitive games with leaderboards. It also allowed users to create their own user page and an email address. The site had multiple chat rooms with custom alert features, private chat and friends list, a dating section, and a broadcast SMS service. It also contained a search engine and directory for WAP content, and displayed converted HTML web pages provided via a web crawler.

== Context ==
The platform was developed at a time when mobile internet was new, and most devices could only connect over simplified adapted protocols such as WAP or i-mode, limiting users' access to content from the wider web. Wapmap.com, the predecessor of MoPilot, was launched in 1999 as a search engine for WAP sites.

Despite the limitations of WAP, MoPilot wanted to take advantage of rapidly expanding mobile internet use in the early 2000s, especially amongst young people. At the time, such portals were often provided by mobile network operators for use only by their own customers, whereas MoPilot could be used on any WAP-enabled carrier internationally. MoPilot partnered with businesses to develop services for the platform.

As mobile technology advanced and smartphones became more popular, the use of WAP services was phased out.

== See also ==
- Wireless Markup Language (WML)
- Mobile web
- WAP gateway
