= Mozilla browser =

Mozilla browser may refer to one of the following web browsers produced by the Mozilla Foundation:

- Mozilla Application Suite, defunct
- Mozilla Firefox, previously known as mozilla/browser, Phoenix and Mozilla Firebird
- Camino (web browser), previously known as Chimera
- Minimo, a.k.a. Mini Mozilla
- SeaMonkey, the successor to Mozilla Application Suite
