= HDML =

HDML may refer to:

- Handheld Device Markup Language
- Harbour defence motor launch
