= Skyfire =

Skyfire may refer to:

- Skyfire (band), a Swedish metal band
- Skyfire (Canberra), an annual fireworks show held in Canberra, Australia
- Skyfire (company), a mobile software company
- SkyFire (spacecraft), a planned nanosatellite spacecraft that will fly by the Moon
- Skyfire (TV series)
- Skyfire (web browser)
- Skyfire (film), a 2019 Chinese action film directed by Simon West
- Skyfire Summit, a UFO conference held by a claimed abduction victim
- Project Skyfire, an investigation of cloud seeding
- Skyfire, the cartoon name for the Transformers Autobot character also known as "Jetfire"
