= Skweezer =

Mobile browser

- Website type: Mobile HTML Transcoder
- Creators: Skweezer, Inc.
- Registration: Not required, free
- Launched: 2003
- Current status: Inactive

Skweezer was a mobile browser. It reformatted and compressed web content in order to reduce a web page's file size and make the downloaded content easier to view on a small screen. It was developed by Skweezer, Inc. and initially released in 2003. Skweezer's technology is used to mobilize Web content service by search engines, Web portals, and wireless carriers such as IAC/InterActiveCorp, Bloglines, and Orange SA. Skweezer was available in English, French, German, Italian, Portuguese, Spanish, and Japanese languages and serves customers in over 175 countries worldwide.

== Mobile browsing innovations ==
Skweezer introduced several mobile browsing innovations, including the first:

- Portal-based transcoding engine: Skweezer (2003)
- Globally distributed mobile advertising platform: Skweezer Ads (2004)
- Pagination system that splits large Web pages up for viewing on cell phones (2005)
- Mobile Web page translation feature (2005)
- Portal-based mobile RSS reader (2005)
- "Find in page" search that carries Web search keywords into search result pages (2007)

== Controversy ==
In 2004 Skweezer became the subject of controversy when blogger Jason Calacanis objected to advertisements being placed by Skweezer on transcoded versions of blog content. A debate ensued over the legality and propriety of proxy-based services such as anonymizers and transcoders placing ads against other publishers' content and the scope of coverage under "fair use" copyright protection. While the subject is still under debate, Greenlight Wireless stopped placing ads on transcoded content in early 2005. As of June 2010, the ads were being displayed again.

== Awards ==
- 2008 Smartphone & Pocket PC Magazine's Best Software Awards: Winner - Pocket PC Internet: Web Compression Service
- 2007 MobileVillage Mobile Star Awards: Gold Star - Consumer Software: Mobile Web Content Aggregator / Portal
- 2007 PDA Friendly Website Awards: Winner - PDA Home Page category
- 2007 Smartphone & Pocket PC Magazine's Best Software Awards: Winner - Pocket PC Internet: Web Compression Service
- 2006 MobileVillage Mobile Star Awards: Gold Star - Personal Software: Mobile Web Content Provider category
- 2005 MobileVillage Mobile Star Awards: Gold Star - Personal Software: Mobile Web Content Provider category
- 2005 Smartphone & Pocket PC Magazine Best Software awards: Finalist - Browsers & Web Utilities category

== Similar services ==
- Google Web Light, but without a URL form. A user-created form is hosted at Neocities.
- Loband by Aptivate
- Skweezer, an online Instagram growth service similar named to Skweezer Inc.
