= Puffer (research study) =

American internet television service

- Developer: Stanford University
- Release: January 18, 2019 (7 years ago)
- Website: puffer.stanford.edu
- Repository: https://github.com/StanfordSNR/puffer

Puffer is a free and open-source live TV research study operated by Stanford University that uses machine learning to improve video streaming algorithms. It is written mostly in the C++ programming language and relies on WebSocket as a transmission layer. The study allows users across the United States to watch seven over-the-air television stations broadcasting in the San Francisco Bay Area media market for free.

== History ==
Puffer was presumed to be launched on January 18, 2019. It was initially led by Francis Yan, a Stanford computer science doctoral student, with Hudson Ayers and Sadjad Fouladi from Stanford, and Chenzhi Zhu from Tsinghua University. The project's facility advisors are professors Keith Winstein and Philip Levis. The research study uses machine learning to improve video-streaming algorithms, such as those commonly used by services like YouTube, Netflix, and Twitch. The goal is to teach a computer to design new algorithms that reduce glitches and stalls in streaming video (especially over wireless networks and those with limited capacities, such as in rural areas), improve picture quality, and predict how the capacity of an Internet connection will change over time.

The service is limited. Only those in the U.S. can sign up, and only up to 500 users can watch Puffer at a time. In addition, the service only re-transmits free over-the-air television channels in the San Francisco Bay Area media market, specifically the following ones picked up by an antenna located on the Stanford campus: KTVU 2 (Fox), KPIX 5 (CBS), KGO 7 (ABC), KQED 9 (PBS), KNTV 11 (NBC), KQED+ 54 (PBS) (July 21, 2023 – August 1, 2023), KPYX 44 (Independent) (returned August 4, 2023), and KDTV 14 (Univision). KRON 4 (The CW/MyNetworkTV) was added in March 2024 after KPYX (then KBCW) changed its CW affiliate status.

The service is not compatible with Apple’s Safari browser or with iPhone and iPad devices because it relies on Media Source Extensions, which are not supported on those platforms.

== Supported apps & devices ==
=== Browsers ===
- Google Chrome
- Mozilla Firefox
- Microsoft Edge
- Opera
- Dolphin

=== Devices ===
- Mac/Windows/Linux computers
- Android phones and tablets
- Android TV devices using Dolphin Browser
