= Openwave =

American mobile data software company

Openwave Systems Inc.

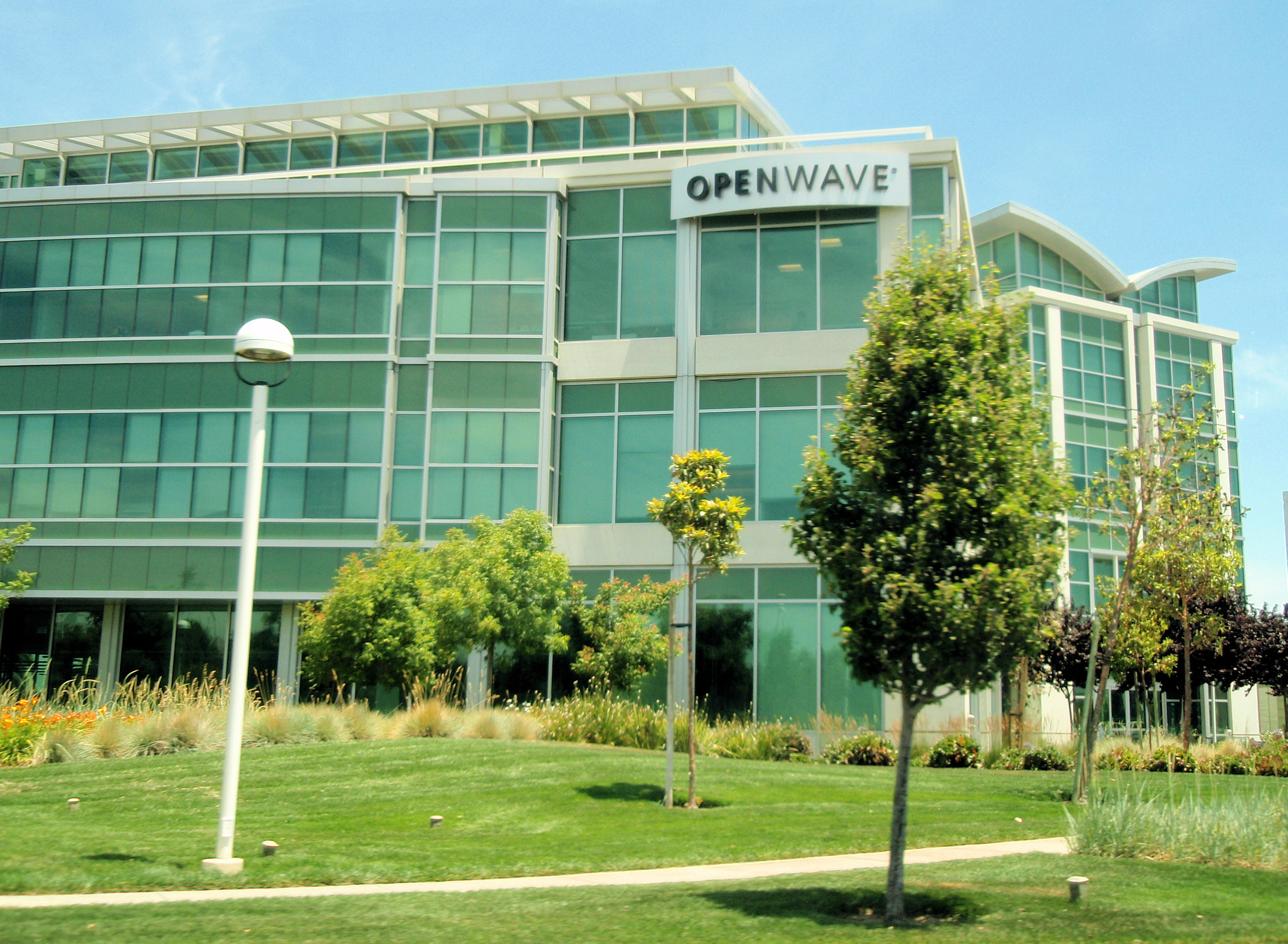
- Former headquarters in Redwood City, California
- Industry: Mobile data software & services
- Founded: 1996 in Redwood City, California, U.S.
- Founder: Alain Rossmann
- Headquarters: Redwood City, California, United States
- Website: openwave.com

Openwave Systems Inc. (formerly software.com, phone.com, and Libris, Inc.) is a division of Enea. It provides video traffic management and 5G mobile products.

Two of Openwave's former products launched as private companies; Openwave Mobility and Openwave Messaging. Openwave contributed to early developments in the Mobile Internet.

Openwave pioneered HDML, a precursor to WML. Openwave was a founding member of the WAP Forum.

== History ==
The company started in 1996 as Libris, Inc. and focused on developing mobile client software for "pull" services based on Internet Protocol while the general mobile market was rapidly growing "push" services based on SMS. In 1996, it changed its name to Unwired Planet, Inc. and launched its proprietary software platform for Internet access and web browsing, known as up.link (browser and network server/gateway).

In 1999, with the introduction of WAP standards, it acquired Apiion, Ltd. of Belfast (formerly Aldiscon Northern Ireland, Ltd.), changed its name to Phone.com and went public on the NASDAQ (NASDAQ:PHCM). In 2000, as Phone.com's revenue and stock price grew, it acquired several startup companies with niche products for integration across its product line. In 2001, it merged with Software.com and renamed the merged company Openwave Systems, Inc. With Software.com's large installed base of email servers at Internet service providers, Openwave expanded by providing its mobile operator customers with software infrastructure for mobile email applications and other multimedia messaging (MMS) applications.

The company's mobile browser (written by Bruce Schwartz) software shipped on over one billion handsets, at one point approx 49% of the global browser-capable device shipments, over 70 mobile operators.

In 2002, it acquired SignalSoft Corp., a developer of location-based services, who developed the first platforms to provide E911 services as per the first FCC (Federal Communications Commission) requirements.

In 2004, Openwave acquired Nombas Inc., the developer of Cmm (a scripting language with C-like syntax) which was later enhanced to support ECMAScript and renamed ScriptEase.

In January 2006, Openwave closed the $120 million acquisition of Musiwave, a French music application services provider for mobile phones founded by Gilles Babinet. In November 2007, the company sold Musiwave to Microsoft for $46 million. In 2007, Openwave faced allegations of securities law violations related to financial reporting, though the outcome of these allegations is not detailed here.

In February 2008, Openwave launched a contextual advertising system for mobile phones.

In May 2008, the San Francisco Business Journal reported that NASDAQ had given Openwave a delisting warning for failing to properly report some financial results.

On June 30, 2008, Openwave issued a press release stating: "that Purple Labs has acquired the Openwave mobile phone software business, which develops and markets its browser and messaging client technologies.".

On October 18, 2010, Openwave announced: "that it licensed certain patents to Mobixell/724 Solutions Inc" as part of an intellectual property protection arrangement.

On May 1, 2012, Openwave announced: "the completion of the sale of its Mediation and Messaging product businesses to Marlin Equity Partners." Openwave changed its name back to Unwired Planet. They are now exclusively focused on licensing and enforcement of IP that it claims is "foundational to mobile communications." In response to claims that the company has become a patent troll, Unwired Planet's general counsel Noah Mesel states: "We happen to be at the point in our business cycle where what's left is a patent portfolio."

The former product businesses have also been re-launched as two privately held companies, Openwave Mobility Inc. and Openwave Messaging Inc.

In 2013, Openwave Messaging acquired Critical Path.

On March 2, 2016, Openwave Messaging was acquired by Synchronoss Technologies and the company started trading under Synchronoss Messaging. As of April 2016, Openwave Mobility continued to operate as a Marlin Equity Company.

In February 2018, Enea purchased Openwave Mobility for $90 million.

== Products ==
Major current products include:

Openwave Mobility

- Integra (platform)
- Media Optimizer
- Mobile Analytics
- Promotion Pricing & Innovation
- Smart User Repository

Earlier products included:

- Openwave: Email Kx, Mobile Access Gateway (MAG), Mobile Browser, Mobile Messaging client
- Openwave Messaging:Email Mx, Network Message Store, Voice and Video Messaging, App Suite, Rich Mail, Edge GX
- Unwired Planet: UP.Link Browser, UP.Link Server

== See also ==
- Internet messaging platform
