= Cake Browser =

Swipeable mobile web browser

- Developers: Cake Technologies, Inc.
- Release: January 30, 2018; 8 years ago
- Operating system: iOS, Android
- Available in: Chinese, English, French, German, Italian, Japanese, Korean, Portuguese, Russian, Spanish
- Type: Mobile browser
- Website: www.cakebrowser.com

Cake Browser was a swipe-based mobile web browser developed by Cake Technologies, Inc., a tech startup founded in 2016 in Provo, Utah. Cake Browser displayed search results as preloaded web pages instead of a list of clickable links. Results were swipeable across standard search verticals, including web search, image search, video search, news, and shopping.

== History ==
In 2017, Cake Browser launched in test markets within Australia, Canada, New Zealand, and Taiwan. It launched globally in 2018. Cake Technologies announced in 2018 that it had raised $5 million in funding for Cake Browser led by Peak Ventures with participation from Pelion Venture Partners and Kickstart Seed Fund.

In late 2022, Cake Browser was silently shut down. As of January 2023, their website redirects to Arc by The Browser Company.
