= WML =

WML may stand for:

- What's My Line?, a game show
- White matter lesion, a lesion of the white matter
- Wireless Markup Language, markup used for mobile phones with Wireless Application Protocol
- Wesnoth Markup Language, a configuration and scripting language for the game The Battle for Wesnoth
- WML, the National Rail station code for Wilmslow railway station, Cheshire, England
