= Lars Boilesen =

Danish-Norwegian business executive

- Education: Aarhus School of Business
- Occupations: CEO, Otello Corporation

Lars Rabæk Boilesen is the CEO of Otello Corporation (formerly Opera Software ASA), having succeeded founder Jon Stephenson von Tetzchner in 2010.

== Career ==
Boilesen is Danish; he earned a bachelor's degree in business economics from Aarhus School of Business and a postgraduate diploma from Kolding Business School, and moved to Norway in 1997. His first position was at the Lego Group, where in the early 1990s he developed the market in Russia; He then worked at Tandberg as head of marketing for the Northern Europe and Asia-Pacific regions, Vice President for Worldwide Sales and Sales Director, and at Alcatel-Lucent as CEO for the Nordic and Baltic countries beginning in 2005.

At Opera (now Otello), he was the Executive Vice President of Sales and Marketing from 2000 to 2005. Boilesen also served on the company's board of directors from 2007 to 2009. Boilesen became CEO after von Tetzchner stepped down from the position on January 5, 2010.

== Personal life ==
Boilesen is married to a Norwegian and has three children (2010). In 2013 he was one of the best paid executives in Norway.
