= Firefox Focus =

Open-source privacy-focused web browser by Mozilla

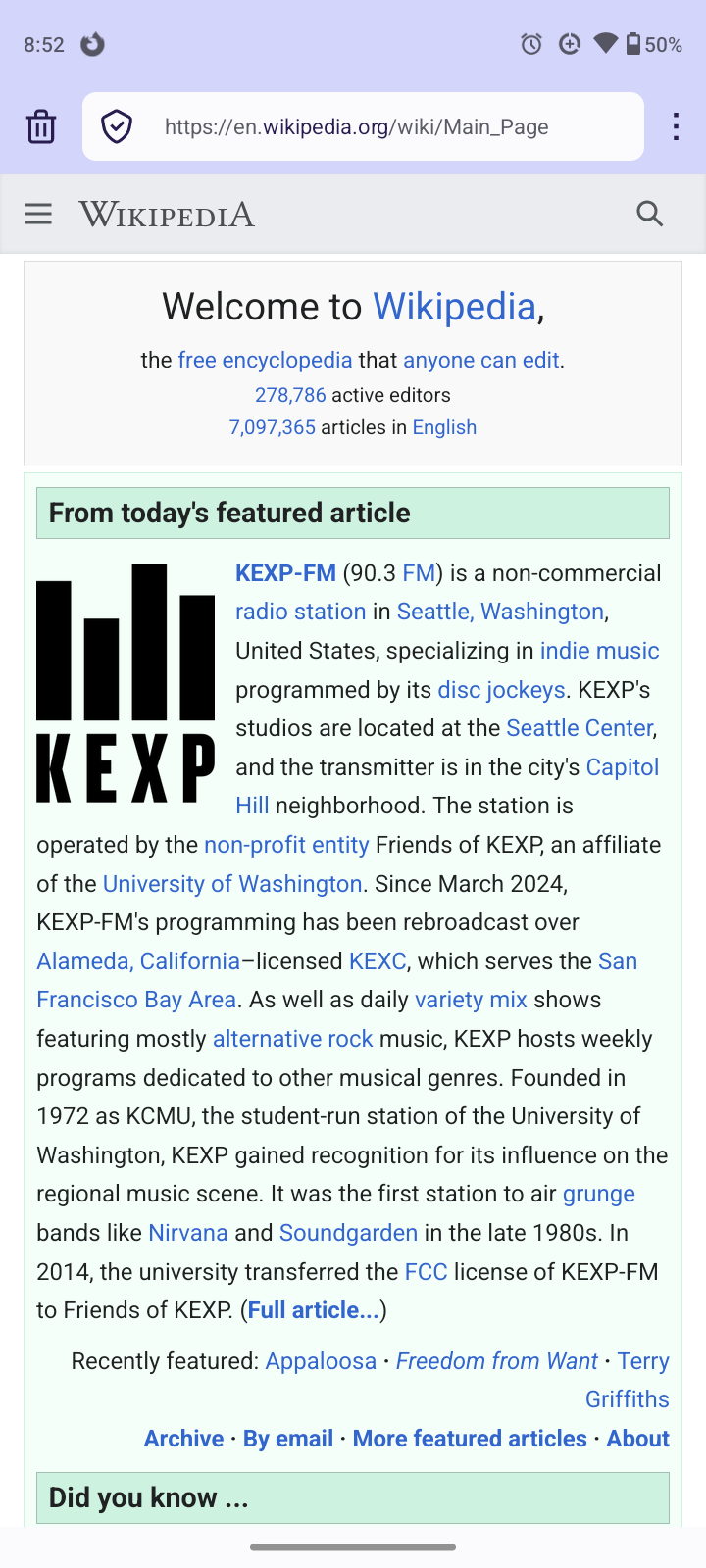
- Firefox Focus showing the Main Page of English Wikipedia
- Developers: Mozilla Foundation; Mozilla Corporation
- Initial release: December 7, 2015; 9 years ago
- Stable release: 139.0 / May 24, 2025; 6 months ago
- Repository: Android: hg-edge.mozilla.org/mozilla-central; iOS: github.com/mozilla-mobile/firefox-ios
- Engine: Android: before 6.x: WebView (i.e. Blink); 7.0 and later: GeckoView i.e. Gecko; iOS: WebKit
- Operating system: iOS, iOS 15.0 and later; iPadOS, iPadOS 15.0 and later; visionOS, visionOS 1.0 and later; Android, Android 8.0 and later
- Type: Mobile browser, Ad-Blocker
- License: MPL 2.0
- Website: www.mozilla.org/en-US/firefox/browsers/mobile/focus/

Firefox Focus is a free and open-source privacy-focused mobile browser by Mozilla, based on Firefox. It is available for Android and iOS smartphones and tablets. Its predecessor, Focus by Firefox, was released in December 2015 as a tracker-blocking application which worked only in conjunction with the Safari mobile browser on iOS. It was developed into a minimalist web browser in 2016 but retained this background blocking functionality. The Android version of the browser was first released in June 2017 and was downloaded over one million times in the first month. As of January 2017, it was available in 27 languages. The version released for German-speaking countries has telemetry disabled and is named Firefox Klar to avoid ambiguity with the German news magazine FOCUS.

== Tracking protection ==
Firefox Focus is designed to block online trackers, including third-party advertising, with the end goal of both improving browsing speed and protecting users' privacy. Content blocking is achieved using the Disconnect block lists. The blocking of third-party trackers (except "other content trackers") is enabled by default. In the other Firefox browsers, users have to enable the tracking protection feature inside the browser preferences manually. Users can also view types of trackers on a page by tapping on the shield icon next to the URL bar. A panel will pop-up and shows what kind of trackers are on that page: ad trackers, analytics trackers, social trackers or content trackers.

On December 20, 2018, Mozilla announced that Firefox Focus now checks all URLs against the Google Safe Browsing service to help prevent people from accessing fraudulent sites.

On iOS devices, Firefox Focus uses the WebKit engine as required by Apple for all browsers on the App Store. On Android, it used the Blink engine in version 6.x and earlier, and it has used GeckoView since version 7.0.

== Functions and integrations ==
Firefox Focus can be set as content-blocker in the Safari web browser options. After activating the Safari integration in the Firefox Focus settings, it will disable trackers automatically in the background when browsing using the Safari browser.

Pressing the trash icon while browsing will delete all session data, and return to the start screen (i.e. display the customisable search bar). Up to 4 favourite links (called Shortcuts) can be set on the home screen of the device.

Firefox Focus contains an option called telemetry. By activating it, users can allow Mozilla to collect and receive non personal-identifiable information to improve Firefox. Due to privacy concerns, telemetry of Firefox Klar is disabled by default.

Beginning July 2018, Firefox Focus was preinstalled on the BlackBerry Key2 Android smartphone as part of the application Locker.

October 15, 2018, Mozilla announced that Firefox Focus is being updated with a new search feature and visual design. That means the browser will conceptually tell users about its features and options.

Opening multiple tabs in Firefox Focus is available on Android.

== Minimum device requirements ==
=== Apple mobile devices ===
There are some minimum hardware requirements to remove tracking contents. The mechanism needs hardware that can handle the extra load of content blocking so it only works on 64-bit devices running iOS 9 and above including:

- iPhone 5s and newer
- iPad Air and newer
- iPad mini 2 and newer
- iPod touch from the 6th generation
- Apple Vision Pro

As of November 2024, iOS 15.0 or later is required to download Firefox Focus on the App Store.

=== Android mobile devices ===
Android version 8.0 or higher is required to download Firefox Focus from the Google Play store and use it on Android.

== Gallery ==
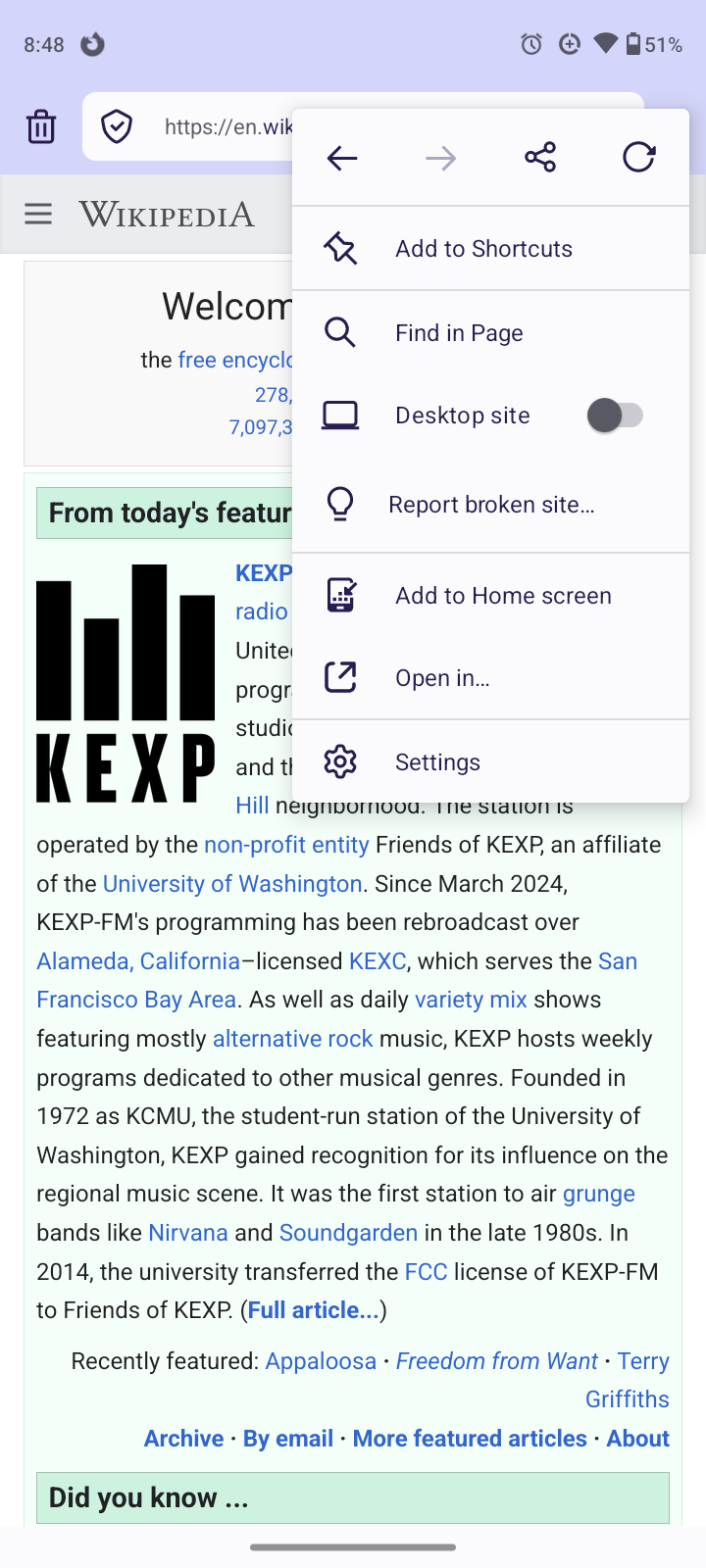
Find in Page

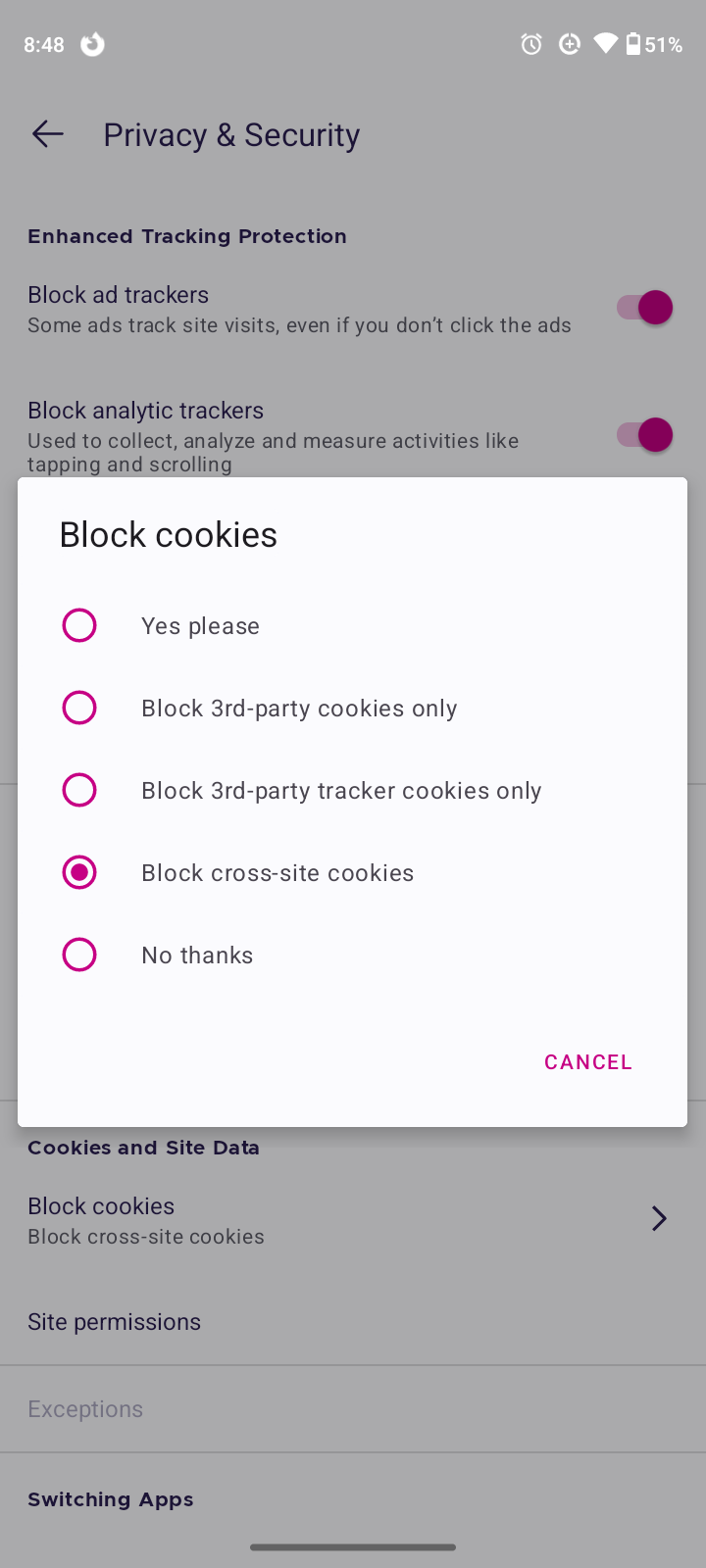
Block cookies

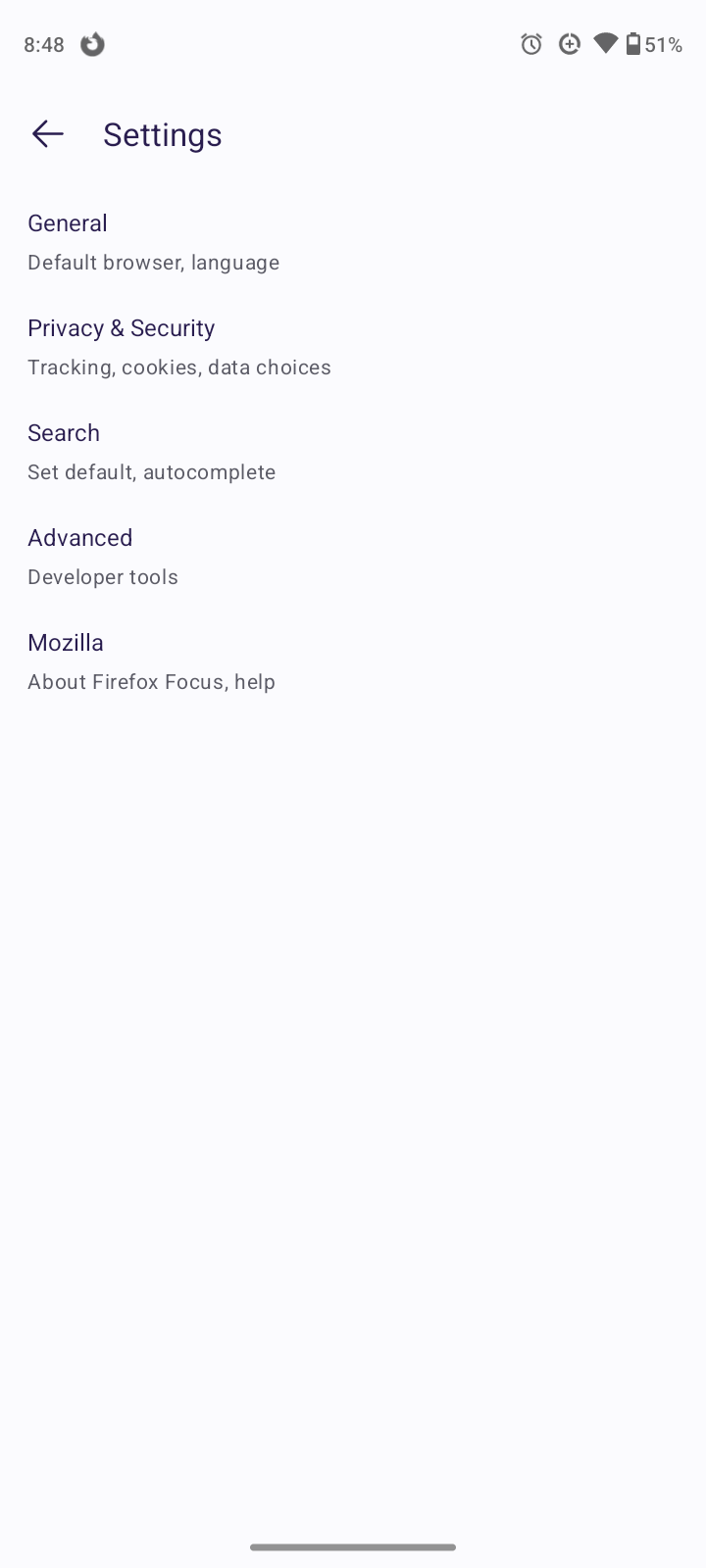
Settings

== See also ==
- Firefox, the desktop web browser
- Firefox for Android, a project for Android smartphones and tablet computers
- Firefox for iOS, a project for iOS smartphones and tablets
- Safari, the default web browser for iOS
- Mobile browser
