= Mercury Browser =

Defunct mobile browser

- Developers: iLegendSoft, Inc.
- Stable release: 3.2.3 / August 17, 2015; 10 years ago
- Operating system: Android
- Type: Mobile browser
- License: Freeware
- Website: See on WebArchive

Mercury Browser is a discontinued freeware mobile browser for Android, developed by iLegendSoft. It was formerly available for iOS, but in 2017, it was removed from the App Store.

== Features ==
Mercury Browser supports tabbed browsing, where users can open and switch between web pages with multiple tabs either at the top of the display or a thumbnail at the bottom. The browser also supports over ten gestures for ten functions, a browser synchronization allowing the user to sync Mozilla Firefox or Google Chrome desktop bookmarks across devices, a private mode that stops the browser from recording the user's search history and cookies, integrated ad blocking, a night mode that dims the screen, and a reading view.

Adobe Flash is only supported in the Android version of the browser.
