= Josh Miller (education) =

American technology executive

- Born: October 1, 1990 (age 36)
- Known for: CEO of The Browser Company
- Website: joshm.co

Josh Miller (born October 1, 1990) is an American technology executive who is the co-founder and CEO of The Browser Company. Between 2015 and 2017, he was the Director of Product for the White House. Previously, he was a co-founder and CEO of Branch, which later sold to Facebook. At Facebook, Miller led the Rooms app.

In high school, Miller was a finalist for a CNN Hero Award and a featured speaker at the Aspen Ideas Festival.
