= Telecooperation Office =

German research group

Coordinates: 49.01372°N 8.42421°E

The Telecooperation Office (TECO) is a research group at the Karlsruhe Institute of Technology in Karlsruhe, Germany. The research group is in the Institute of Telematics, and is attached to the chair for Pervasive Computing Systems, currently held by Michael Beigl.

== History ==
The TECO, originally titled "The Telecooperation Office (TecO)", was founded in 1993 at the Karlsruhe Institute of Technology (then University of Karlsruhe (TH)) for research and development in applied telematics by Prof. Gerhard Krüger and the Campus-based Engineering Center (CEC) of the Digital Equipment Corporation (DEC). The main focus of research conducted at TECO has been on Pervasive and Ubiquitous Computing, with emphasis on wireless communication, Embedded Systems, Situational Awareness and Human Computer Interaction.

When DEC was taken over by Compaq, the CEC in Karlsruhe was taken over by SAP AG and was attached to SAP Research Germany. The close research ties and cooperation between the DEC and the TECO were also transferred to SAP. The TECO continues to work in close cooperation with SAP Research, and was later attached to Prof. Wilfried Juling.

In April 2010, the Chair for Pervasive Computing Systems was founded as a "New Shared Field Group" in cooperation with SAP AG. This Chair was awarded to Michael Beigl, and the TECO was brought under the new chair as a research lab with the title "TECO: Technology for Pervasive Computing". Currently the TECO contains 2 post-doctorate researchers and 11 research assistants / PhD students.

== Research Focus ==
The focus of research is currently on various topics with the field of Pervasive and Ubiquitous Computing. These include the fields of Activity Recognition, Context and Situation Awareness in embedded, mobile and distributed systems. Other past research foci in Pervasive and Ubiquitous Computing include Wireless sensor networks and RFID technology and Human-Computer Interaction. The current fields of research include the following:

- Sensor and RFID technology
- Communication, Collaboration, Networks and Middleware
- Human-Computer Interaction
- System Design and Engineering
- Security, Privacy and Trust

== Notable Contributions ==
The first mobile browser for a hand-held device, called PocketWeb, was developed at the TECO on the Apple Newton. The MediaCup was an early example of Ubiquitous Computing appliance, demonstrating awareness in embedded systems. The TECO also organized and played a major role in initiating the HUC/Ubicomp conference series in 1999, which is now the major conference in the field of Ubiquitous Computing. The "Point & Click" human-computer interaction paradigm developed at the TECO presented at this conference is now widely used to control devices in pervasive computing environments. The Smart-Its developed at the TECO, was the first European wireless sensor network in the private sector.
