= Firefox for Android =

Android web browser by Mozilla

- Firefox (Android) 158.0.1 displaying the Main Page of the English Wikipedia
- Developers: Mozilla Foundation and its contributors; Mozilla Corporation
- Release: March 29, 2011; 15 years ago

Stable release(s) [±]
- 159.0.1 (November 3, 2026; 4 days ago) [±]

Preview release(s) [±]
- Beta: 160.0b5 / November 5, 2026; 2 days ago
- Nightly: 162.0a1 / November 5, 2026; 2 days ago
- Written in: Kotlin, JavaScript and others; including C++ and Rust because of its rendering engine
- Operating system: Android 8.0 "Oreo" and above
- Size: Android, arm-v7a: 63.48 MB; Android, arm64-v8a: 69.53 MB; Android, x86-64: 70.25 MB
- Type: Mobile browser
- License: MPL 2.0, invokes proprietary components including Google Play Services
- Website: www.firefox.com/en-US/browsers/mobile/
- Repository: hg.mozilla.org/mozilla-central

Firefox for Android is a web browser developed by Mozilla for Android smartphones and tablet computers. As with its desktop version, it uses the Gecko layout engine, and supports features such as synchronization with Firefox Sync, and add-ons.

The initial version of Firefox for Android was codenamed Fennec and branded Firefox for mobile; it initially supported Maemo and Android before supporting MeeGo and Firefox OS as well. Support for Maemo was later dropped. In 2020, a redesigned version of Firefox for Android (codenamed Fenix, and also branded as Firefox Daylight) was released, which introduced a new internal architecture and user interface inspired by Firefox Focus, new privacy features, and switching to curated WebExtensions for add-ons.

== History ==
Firefox for mobile, codenamed "Fennec", was first released for Maemo in January 2010 with version 1.0 and for Android in March 2011 with version 4.0. Support for Maemo was discontinued after version 7, released in September 2011. The codename Fennec comes from the fennec fox, a small desert fox (just as the Fennec browser is a small version of the Firefox desktop browser). Firefox for Maemo Beta 5, released in 2009, was the first version to have the official Firefox branding, with the Firefox name and logo.

Fennec uses the Gecko engine; for example, version 1.0 used the same engine as Firefox 3.6, and the following release, 4.0, shared core code with Firefox 4.0. Its features include HTML5 support, Firefox Sync, add-ons support and tabbed browsing. The browser's version numbering was bumped from version 2.0 beta to version 4.0 to more closely match desktop releases of Firefox since the rendering engines used in both browsers are the same.

Plugin support was initially disabled by default, removing compatibility with popular web content types such as Adobe Flash. In September 2011, Flash support was implemented in pre-release builds for pre-Honeycomb versions of Android. Flash support for Android 2.x and 4.x was enabled for most smartphones in version 14.0; later it was removed in version 56.0.

On June 27, 2019, Mozilla unveiled Firefox Preview (codename "Fenix"), a redesigned version of Firefox for Android based on GeckoView – an implementation of Gecko that is decoupled as a reusable library, intended to be used as an alternative to the default Android WebView component (based on Blink engine). GeckoView was first used by Firefox Focus, whose design influenced aspects of Fenix. It has a redesigned user interface with support for dark mode, a new "Collections" feature for saving sets of tabs, and includes Enhanced Tracking Protection (a configurable blocker for web trackers and third-party cookies) and a redesigned private browsing mode.

The Firefox for Android Beta channel was migrated to the Fenix branch in April 2020, and it was officially released to the stable channel in August 2020 as version 79, branded as Firefox Daylight. The last Fennec-based version was version 68, which was released in July 2019, and received bug and security fixes until July 2020.

=== Firefox Lite ===
Firefox Lite

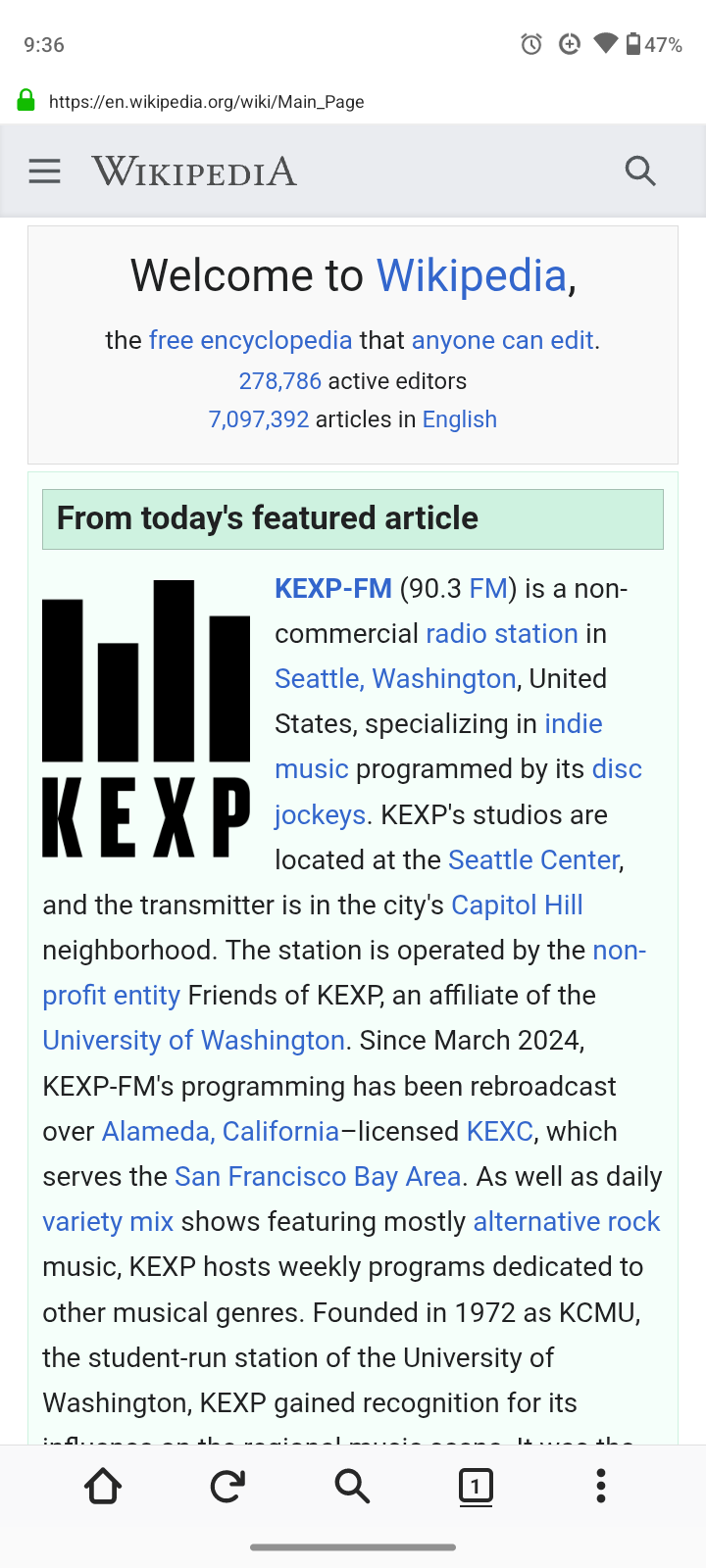
- Firefox Lite running on Android
- Other names: Firefox Rocket
- Developer: Mozilla Taiwan
- Release: November 1, 2018; 8 years ago
- Final release: 2.6.2 / June 30, 2021; 5 years ago
- Preview release: 0.8.0 / October 8, 2017; 9 years ago
- Engine: WebView (i.e. Blink)
- Operating system: Android
- Successor: Firefox for Android
- Size: 6.51 MB
- Type: Mobile browser
- License: MPL 2.0, uses proprietary components, including Google Play Services
- Website: support.mozilla.org/en-US/kb/get-started-firefox-lite
- Repository: github.com/mozilla-mobile/FirefoxLite

Firefox Lite, formerly Firefox Rocket, was a lightweight free and open-source web browser developed by Mozilla Taiwan for Android smartphones and tablets. Initially released only in Indonesia, it was available in various emerging markets. With an APK size of 6.51 MB, it featured Turbo Mode (enabled by default), which blocked third-party content of web pages such as ads and trackers, and a toggle to disable web images, to speed page loads and use less mobile data. In addition, it had a private browsing mode, tabs, night mode, and the ability to screenshot the entire page. It used the built-in Android WebView as the browser engine. Due to release of the refreshed Firefox for Android and Firefox Focus, that contains Firefox Lite capabilities (except for the tiny size, that being the point of Firefox Lite) and replaced it, support for Firefox Lite ended on June 30, 2021.

Firefox Rocket was initially released as an open beta limited to the Indonesian market on October 8, 2017. Firefox Lite was available in Bangladesh, Brunei, Cambodia, China, Hong Kong, India, Indonesia, Laos, Malaysia, Myanmar, Singapore, Thailand, Taiwan, the Philippines, and Vietnam through the Google Play store as of March 13, 2019. Support had expanded up to 42 countries by the final release.

== Add-ons ==
Firefox for Android allows installation of extensions. Firefox Daylight/"Fenix" uses the same WebExtensions architecture as the desktop version of Firefox, but not all APIs are supported.

The stable build of Firefox for Android has general WebExtension support as of version 120; Mozilla announced in November 2023 that all add-ons marked as Android-compatible by developers would be shown on addons.mozilla.org by December 14, 2023. On December 14, 2023, Mozilla announced that more than 450 add-ons are available for download on Firefox for Android.

== Platforms ==
Firefox Daylight requires Android Oreo or later; earlier versions of Firefox also supported earlier versions of Android. Support for Android devices that ran x86 processors was added in December 2013, and lasted until October 2025.

=== Previously or unofficially supported ===
Previously, Firefox for mobile supported other platforms besides Android.

Official support for the Nokia N900 Maemo device ceased with version 7.

Firefox mobile was available for MeeGo through the third-party OpenRepos repository. For operating systems not supported by Fennec, like Sailfish OS (based on Mer project), web browsers can use embedlite (IPCLiteAPI), a lightweight embedding API.

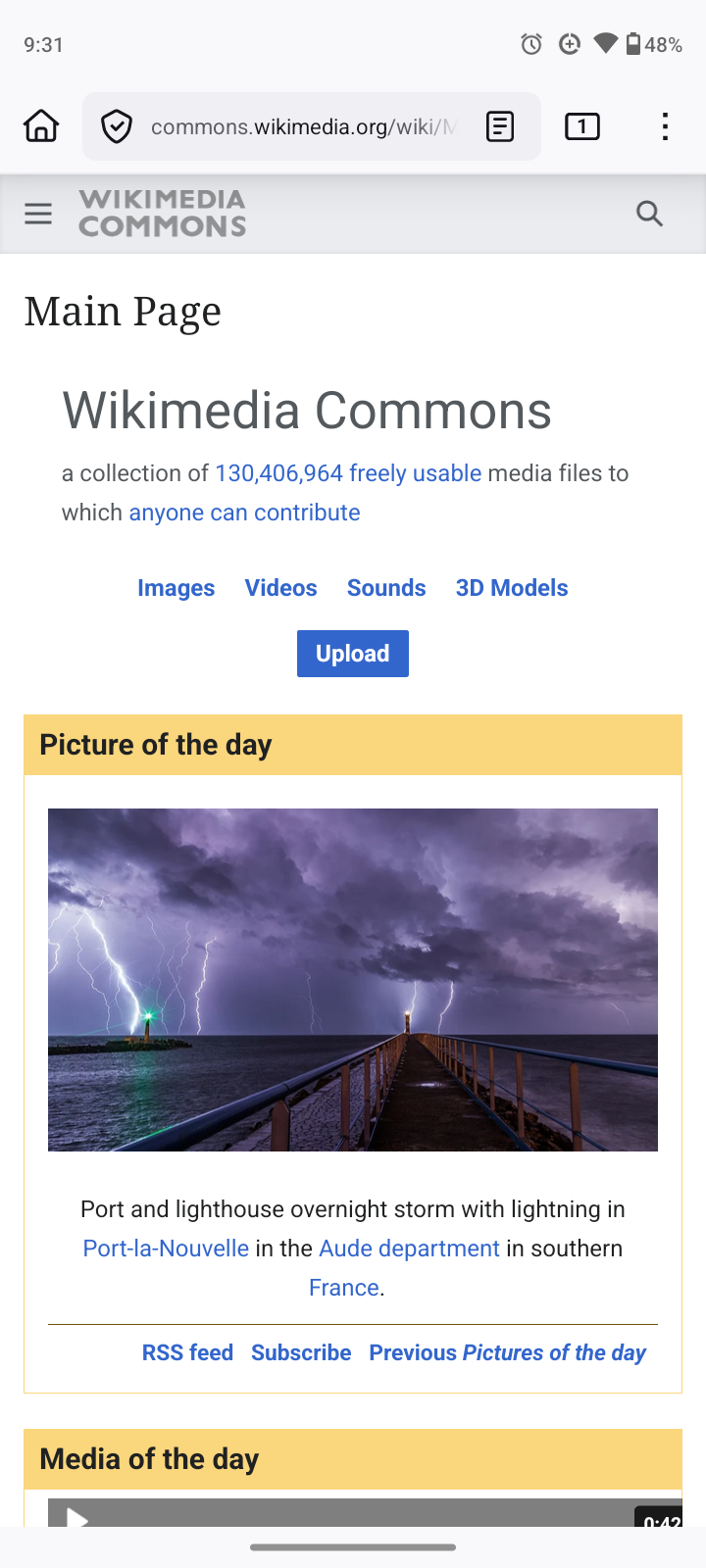
Firefox for Android 145 viewing Wikimedia Commons Mobile

An alpha build of version 1.1 (1.1 Alpha 1) for Windows Mobile, released on February 19, 2010, is the last build for this operating system. Following the Windows Phone 7 announcement and Microsoft's decision not to release a native development kit, as with Android and other systems, development for Windows Mobile was put on hold. If Microsoft releases a native development kit in the future for its Windows Phone OS, then Mozilla will consider again developing Fennec for the platform.

Tristan Nitot, president of Mozilla Europe, has said that it is unlikely that a BlackBerry OS version will be released, citing BlackBerry's limited operating system as the reason. Mozilla has no plans to develop Firefox for the Symbian platform, or webOS. An unofficial port to WebOS was made, but is no longer maintained as of 2011.

An unofficial port is available for the Pandora handheld console.

Firefox 52.0.2 was the last version to run on ARM devices without NEON support, such as those with Tegra 2.

Firefox 143.0.4 was the last version to run on Android Lollipop through Android Nougat.

Operating system		Latest stable version	Support status
Android (including Android-x86 and Android for ARMv6)	8.0 and later	159.0.1 (x64)	2018–
Android (including Android-x86 and Android for ARMv6)	8.0 and later	159.0.1 (ARM64)	2017–
Android (including Android-x86 and Android for ARMv6)	8.0 and later	159.0.1 (ARMv7)	2017–
Android (including Android-x86 and Android for ARMv6)	5.0–7.1	143.0.4 (x64)	2018–2025
Android (including Android-x86 and Android for ARMv6)	5.0–7.1	143.0.4 (ARM64)	2017–2025
Android (including Android-x86 and Android for ARMv6)	5.0–7.1	143.0.4 (IA-32)	2014–2025
Android (including Android-x86 and Android for ARMv6)	5.0–7.1	143.0.4 (ARMv7)	2014–2025
Android (including Android-x86 and Android for ARMv6)	4.1–4.4	68.11.0 (x64)	2018–2020
Android (including Android-x86 and Android for ARMv6)	4.1–4.4	68.11.0 (IA-32)	2013–2020
Android (including Android-x86 and Android for ARMv6)	4.1–4.4	68.11.0 (ARMv7)	2012–2020
Android (including Android-x86 and Android for ARMv6)	4.0	55.0.2 (IA-32)	2013–2017
Android (including Android-x86 and Android for ARMv6)	4.0	55.0.2 (ARMv7)	2011–2017
Android (including Android-x86 and Android for ARMv6)	3.0–3.2	45.0.2 (ARMv7)	2011–2016
Android (including Android-x86 and Android for ARMv6)	2.3	47.0 (ARMv7)	2011–2016
Android (including Android-x86 and Android for ARMv6)	2.2–4.4	31.3.0esr (ARMv6)	2012–2015
Android (including Android-x86 and Android for ARMv6)	2.2	31.0 (ARMv7)	2011–2014
Android (including Android-x86 and Android for ARMv6)	2.1	19.0.2 (ARMv6)	2012–2013
Android (including Android-x86 and Android for ARMv6)	2.1	19.0.2 (ARMv7)	2011–2013
Android (including Android-x86 and Android for ARMv6)	2.0	6.0.2 (ARMv7)	2011
Firefox OS	2.2	35/36/37	2015
Firefox OS	2.1	33/34	2014–2015
Firefox OS	2.0	31/32	2014–2015
Firefox OS	1.4	30	2014
Firefox OS	1.3	28	2014
Firefox OS	1.2	26	2013
Firefox OS	1.1	18	2013
Maemo	5	7.0.1	2010–2011
Maemo	4	1.1	2010–2011
Windows Mobile	6.x	1.0a3	N/A

Legend:
Unsupported
Supported
Latest version

Notes

- Firefox for iOS is not listed in this table as its version numbers would be misleading. Prior to version 96, it used version numbers distinct from other Firefox versions, which share the core Gecko rendering engine. The iOS app uses the operating system's rendering engine (WebKit), rather than Mozilla's (Gecko).

== Reception ==
Usage share of lesser-used mobile browsers since 2013. Firefox usage share grew through March and April 2014.

The main criticisms of the browser pre-version 14 were slow browsing speed, lack of plugin support and performance issues. To address these concerns, Mozilla redesigned the browser in version 14.0, adding Flash support, improving start-up speed, as well as other enhancements. This update dramatically improved Firefox for Android. As of September 2014, the average user rating of Firefox for Android on the Google Play Store is 4.4.

Compared to the stock Android browser and Chrome on Android, Firefox has a small market share; for the month of November 2015, Firefox for Android usage share of all mobile/tablet browsers was just 0.81%. Despite that, Firefox for Android enjoys a high Play Store rating, has over 100 million downloads, and continues to be developed. The latest version supports Android 4.0 and higher (as Android 2.3 support was dropped in version 48).

In its 2015 Android browser comparison, Spanish software news and reviews site Softonic.com awarded Firefox version 37.0.1 the Best of 2015 nod, with reviewer Fabrizio Benedetti citing a good design, efficient memory consumption, the browser's open source nature, and independence.

In August 2020, Mozilla released a major update of Firefox for Android, version 79, which had been in development for more than 1 year with the codename "Firefox Daylight". It was described by Mozilla as being "dramatically redesigned to be faster, easy to use, customizable and private". However, it received intense criticism from users, who complained that it was more difficult to use, and slower, and various features were suddenly missing. Some online Tech Writers even recommended people to disable the update if possible.

in February 2026, a new menu redesign was introduced in Firefox for Android that disabled the drop down menu found in version 149 (even if "Enable Composable Toolbar" debug setting was disabled). This later affected browser forks such as Waterfox. There have been multiple complaints in relation to this following the change and subsequent bug relating to its ability to be reverted since its introduction.

=== Security advantages ===
A number of devices run older versions of Android. Some would not be upgraded to newer versions because of insufficient technical knowledge by users, or their lack of access to mobile data; some devices cannot be upgraded because of low system resources, or the manufacturer and telecoms operator have failed to provide an update.

As of early 2015, Google has stopped issuing its own patches for Android 4.3 and earlier to the WebView browser component and the WebKit rendering engine therein, which are used by the native/stock and often default AOSP browser in a large number of Android devices – thereby shifting the patching responsibility to device manufacturers. In time, the native browser or browser components become outdated, increasingly insecure, and unable to properly render modern websites.

As a workaround, a Google engineer suggested using the separately-installable and updateable Google Chrome or Firefox browsers. In case of Ice Cream Sandwich (4.0.x), Google stopped supporting that branch of Android with updates to its Chrome browser after Chrome 43, and moved up to Android 4.1 as the oldest release supported by Google Chrome.

The open-source nature of Firefox has made it possible to maintain its development for operating system versions that are past their product support life cycle, and has resulted in Firefox having stronger security and better support for modern web standards. This in effect extends the useful lifetime of devices stuck on older major versions of Android.

Comparison of stock browser and Firefox 38 on Android 2.3 showing Wikipedia mobile

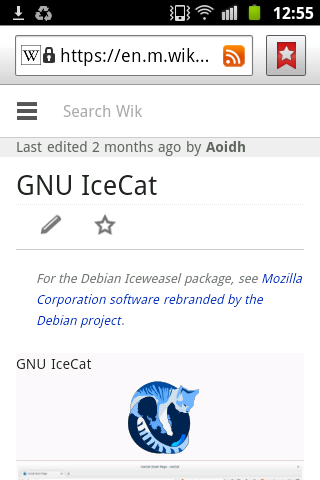
Stock browser. The search box is somewhat narrow, with instruction text cut off.

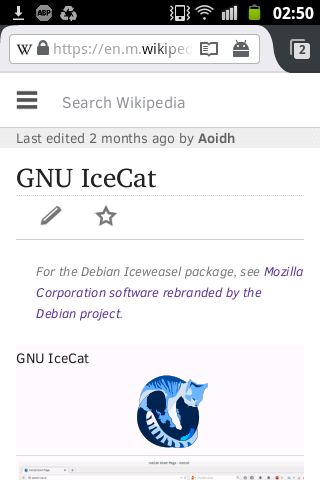
Firefox 38: The search box is at full width.

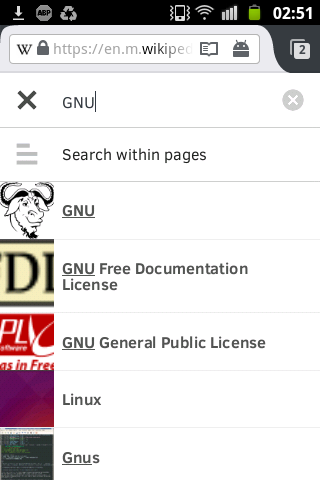
Search suggestions also work in Firefox.

== Forks and code reuse ==
=== Adblock Browser ===
On 20 May 2015, Eyeo GmbH, the maintainers of Adblock Plus, released Adblock Browser 1.0 beta, which is based on Firefox for Android. The browser uses a similar blocking/permitting model as Adblock Plus, allowing by default ads deemed "acceptable" by Eyeo. A major drawback compared to Firefox for Android is Adblock Browser's lack of support for Firefox Sync.

Initial reviews have been mixed: On one hand, users would be happy to have less ads and resource consumption on their devices; on the other hand, web services, publications, content creators and bloggers rely on advertisements for their revenue and income.

Adblock Browser 1.0 was released on 7 September 2015. It's compatible with Android 2.3 or greater, and has about the same system requirements as Firefox for Android.

=== Fennec F-Droid ===
Fennec F-Droid's goal is to remove all proprietary binaries from Firefox; some proprietary binaries, however, still remained in the app. The Fennec F-Droid app is hosted in the open-source F-Droid app repository since 1 February 2015 beginning with version 35.0. Since September 2020, it is based on Firefox despite still being named "Fennec F-Droid".

=== Orfox ===
On 30 June 2015, The Guardian Project announced a stable alpha of Orfox, the new mobile counterpart of the Tor Browser. Orfox is built from Fennec (Firefox for Android) code and the Tor Browser code repository, and is given security hardening patches by the Tor Browser development team. Some of the Orfox build work is based on the Fennec F-Droid project.

The project removed in Orfox the WebRTC component and Chromecast connectivity, and app permissions to access the camera, microphone, contacts (address book), location data (GPS et al.), and NFC. Orfox is to supersede the Orweb browser project, which used the WebView engine.

On 3 September 2019, both The Guardian Project and The Tor Project announced that Orfox had seen its final release and that Orfox had effectively become Tor Browser for Android.

=== IronFox ===
IronFox is fork of the DivestOS Mull Browser, and not Mullvad Browser

=== LibreOffice ===
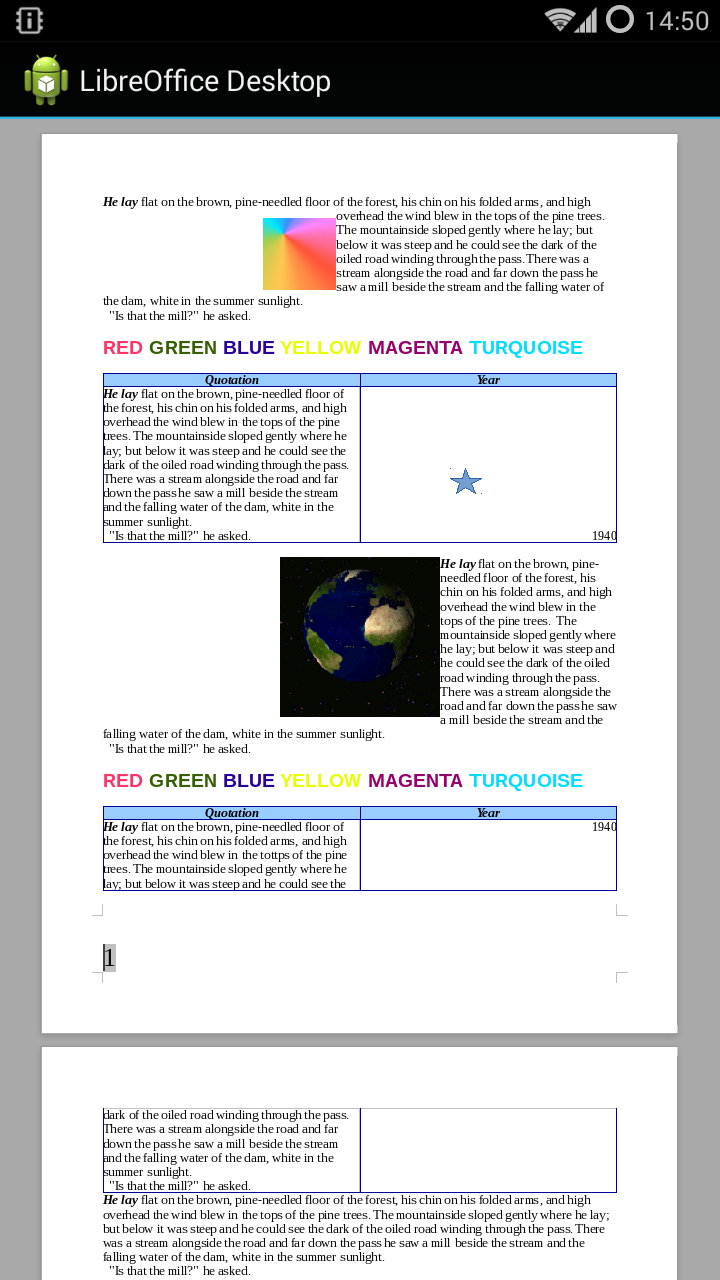
LibreOffice on Android

Firefox for Android (Fennec)'s front-end code was taken as a base for the new development in the LibreOffice project for Android (along with the pre-existing cross-platform LibreOffice document engine). Further work made that Fennec code the core component of LibreOffice Viewer for Android, which was released on 28 May 2015 for Android 4.0 or newer.

== See also ==
- Firefox for iOS – version of Firefox for the mobile operating system iOS
- Firefox Focus – a privacy-focused mobile web browser
- Firefox – Mozilla's web browser for desktop computers
- Google Chrome for Android – the default web browser for most Android devices
- Minimo – a previous project to create a mobile Mozilla browser
- MicroB – a Mozilla-based mobile browser for Nokia Maemo
- Mobile browser
