= Otello Corporation =

Norwegian internet company

Otello Corporation ASA
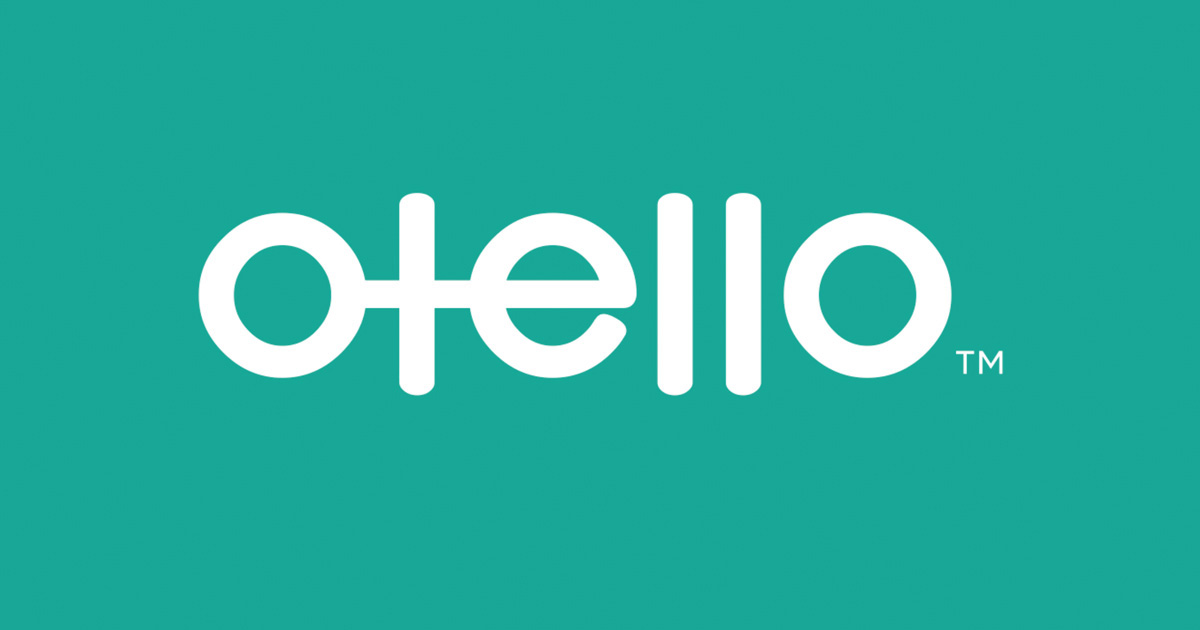
- Current logo of Otello Corp.
- Formerly: Opera Software ASA (1995-2016)
- Type: Public ASA
- Traded as: OSE: OTELLO
- ISIN: NO0010040611
- Industry: Software; Internet; Advertising
- Founded: 22 June 1995; 31 years ago in Oslo, Norway
- Headquarters: Oslo, Norway
- Area served: Americas; Europe; Middle East; Africa; Asia–Pacific
- Key people: Lars Boilesen (CEO); Petter Lade (CFO & Head-Investor Relations); Roar Olbergsveen (CAO); Andrzej Dzius (CTO)
- Services: Online advertising; Mobile apps; Data optimization
- Revenue: ▼US$99.2 million (2017); US$142.5 million (2016)
- Net income: ▼ -US$15.4 million (2017); -US$30.3 million (2016)
- Total assets: ▼US$636.5 million (2017); US$836.9 million (2016)
- Number of employees: 5 (2026)
- Divisions: Business sales; Information technologies
- Subsidiaries: AdColony Inc.; Bemobi Midia e Entretenimento Ltda.; Skyfire Labs
- Website: otellocorp.com

Otello Corporation ASA (formerly Opera Software ASA) is a Norwegian internet company which develops advertising and mobile software for operators, publishers and advertisers. It operates through its subsidiaries which include AdColony (formerly Opera Mediaworks), a mobile advertising platform and network, Bemobi, a subscription-based mobile application and game discovery service, and Skyfire Labs, which provides mobile operators cloud based access for network management and video optimization, and advertising facilitation.

Opera Software ASA was founded as a holding company for Opera products and businesses. It changed its name to Otello Corporation after it sold off its web browser and consumer business along with the Opera brand (Opera Software AS) to a Chinese consortium of investors. While initially it planned to wholly sell itself off to the consortium the deal did not go through due to regulatory approvals, it settled by selling its consumer-facing web browser business instead.

== Acquisitions ==
On 11 March 2004, the company was listed on the Oslo Stock Exchange with the ticker OPERA.

On September 20, 2005, Opera announced that they would remove the ad from the browser and make it free.

On 20 January 2010, Opera Software (Note: Now Otello Corporation.) announced that it had acquired AdMarvel, Inc.

On 30 April 2010, Opera Software acquired Australian web email provider FastMail. In September 2013, the staff of FastMail bought the company back from Opera Software.

On 19 September 2011, Opera Software announced that it had acquired mobile application platform Handster, the leading independent app store for Android apps at that time, in order to strengthen the Opera Mobile Store's offerings to consumers, mobile operators and handset manufacturers.

On 15 February 2013, Opera Software announced that it had acquired Skyfire for $155 million. Opera primarily targeted the company for its video optimization technologies, such as its Rocket Optimizer platform, which would complement its own content optimization technologies.

On 4 June 2014, Opera Software announced that it is acquiring AdColony to bolster its mobile video ad capabilities. Opera paid $75 million in cash for AdColony, plus potential earn-out payments of up to $275 million.

In March 2015, Opera Software acquired the Canadian VPN company, SurfEasy and later integrated the SurfEasy VPN into Opera as a free and unlimited service for its users. On September 22, 2015, Opera announced that they would remove "Software" from its logo.

In December 2017, AdColony CEO, Will Kassoy stepped down from his position and was replaced by Otello CEO, Lars Boilesen.

In 2021, Digital Turbine Inc. is acquiring AdColony from Otello for $400 million.

== Divestitures ==
On 20 December 2016, control of Opera TV AS was sold to Moore Frères & Company. On 15 September 2017, Opera TV AS changed its name to Vewd Software AS, which was later acquired by Xperi in 2022.

On 6 November 2017, Opera Software divested its SurfEasy subsidiary by selling it to Symantec for $38.5 million all in cash. 85% of the payment was released on November 6, 2017 by Symantec with the remaining 15% remaining in escrow for up to 15 months. Specific earn-out targets were not publicly mentioned.
