= Synchronica =

Synchronica plc
- Type: Public limited company
- Traded as: AIM: SYNC; TSX-V: SYN
- Industry: Computer software
- Founded: 1995, Bodiam, England (DAT Group), 2004, Berlin, Germany (Synchronica)
- Defunct: 2012
- Headquarters: Royal Tunbridge Wells, England
- Website: www.synchronica.com

Synchronica plc was a public listed software vendor which developed and marketed mobile messaging solutions for mobile network operators and mobile phone manufacturers. Its flagship product provided push email, instant messaging and social networking to a wide range of mobile phones, and was branded as Unity.

Synchronica was one of the industry's principal users of open industry standards, and their products supported the relevant standards developed by the Open Mobile Alliance (OMA). In 2004, Synchronica became the first company to deploy a live installation of a SyncML device management (now OMA DM) server in a carrier-grade environment, with Siemens Mobile AG.

On 16 April 2012, Synchronica was acquired by Switzerland's Myriad Group, in an all-share deal which valued the company at £23.9 million (around US$38 million). Myriad delisted Synchronica from the London Stock Exchange and the Toronto Stock Exchange during Mid-May 2012.

== History ==
Synchronica Software GmbH was founded in 2004, specializing in open industry standards-based synchronization and device management solutions for the mobile industry.

In March 2005, Synchronica was acquired by AIM listed infrastructure consultancy DAT Group, headquartered in the village of Bodiam in East Sussex. Later that year, the newly created group company underwent a management restructuring and rebranding to Synchronica plc.

In April 2006, Synchronica moved headquarters from Bodiam to the historic town of Royal Tunbridge Wells in Kent.

In September 2011, the founder and CEO of the company, Carsten Brinkschulte, resigned from his position citing disagreements with the other board members regarding future strategy.

At the time of the acquisition of Synchronica by Myriad, it emerged that the CFO, Angus Dent had acquired 800,000 shares in the company after the initial approach by Myriad - generating a profit of £48,000 following the sale. This transaction was investigated by the FSA under the insider trading regulations.

== Acquisitions ==
Synchronica engaged in several strategic acquisitions in an effort to bolster its competitive position in the fiercely contested mobile messaging market.

In November 2007, Synchronica acquired the assets and intellectual property of the US-based mobile email specialist GoodServer whose email enablement and integration technology was already a key part of Synchronica's Mobile Gateway product.

Another key deal, which was completed in September 2008, was the acquisition of AxisMobile Limited. AxisMobile Limited was the operating subsidiary of Synchronica's competitor, AxisMobile plc. AxisMobile developed a number of email technologies suitable for the consumer mass-market, and this intellectual property is now fully owned by Synchronica, who have integrated it into their Mobile Gateway product.

In March 2010, Synchronica acquired the OMA Instant Messaging and Presence Service business, reseller agreements, and existing worldwide mobile operator customer base, of the Instant Messaging developer Colibria AS. Synchronica integrated Colibria's IM technology into Mobile Gateway. In September of the same year, Synchronica acquired its Canadian mobile email rival, iseemedia Inc. As part of the deal, Synchronica acquired iseemedia's patent-pending document streaming technology, as well as contracts with three large mobile operators in India and South-East Asia.

In February 2011, Synchronica acquired the assets of instant messaging vendor Neustar NGM including product, intellectual property and eleven customer contracts with international mobile operators and two tier-1 device manufacturers. In August 2011, Synchronica completed its final acquisition by taking the operator-branded messaging (OBM) assets from the Nokia Corporation which provided email and instant messaging (IM) services to tier one mobile operators in North America.
