= Google Web Light =

Service offered by Google

Google Web Light, introduced in 2015, was a service offered by Google for faster browsing within its Android mobile browser Chrome. It detected slow Internet connections, such as 2G, and switched to Google proxy servers with built-in data compression. It could speed up loading times for text-based websites. These pages also had the advantage of being less taxing on the hardware of entry-level devices with less processing power.

This service was offered in select countries including Indonesia, Brazil and India.

Google Web Light bypassed content filters, prompting some content filter providers to block it.

On December 19, 2022, Google announced that it had discontinued the Web Light service by removing the documentation and retiring the Web Light user agent. Increased affordability of more powerful smartphones was cited as the reason for this decision.

== See also ==
- Google AMP
