= WMLScript =

Programming language

WMLScript is a procedural programming language and dialect of JavaScript used for WML pages that is part of the Wireless Application Protocol (WAP), and was published on April 30, 1998.

WMLScript is a client-side scripting language and is similar to JavaScript. Similarly to JavaScript, WMLScript is used for tasks such as user input validation, generation of error messages, and other dialog boxes.

WMLScript is based on ECMAScript (European Computer Manufacturers Association Script), which is JavaScript's standardized version. Thus, the syntax of WMLScript is similar to JavaScript, but not fully compatible. WMLScript does not have objects or arrays like Javascript does. It does allow the programmer to declare and include external functions from other scripts. WMLScript is optimized for low power consumption and is compiled with bytecode.

Some versions of WMLScript include 1.0, which was the launch version from April 30, 1998; 1.1, which released on June 16th, 1999 and brought some minor enhancements; 1.2 was released in June 2000, but is less documented and lacks a more specific publication date. On October 25, 2001, a consolidated version of WMLScript was released, and unified all versions: this was not a new version, it only standardized formatting and unified the specification. Additionally, there is a disputed 1.3 version that was not officially released or standardized by the OMA, but appears in some third party sources.

== WMLScript code ==
WMLScript needs to be called by a WML <a> or <do> element to run inside the document you want, because it lacks page load features that languages like JavaScript have.

<?xml version="1.0"?>
<!DOCTYPE wml PUBLIC "-//WAPFORUM//DTD WML 1.1//EN" "http://www.wapforum.org/DTD/wml_1.1.xml">

<wml>
  <card id="card1" title="WMLScript">
    <p>
      <a href="helloWorld.wmls#helloWorld()">Run WMLScript</a><br/> <!-- Runs the script-->
      $(message)
    </p>
  </card>
</wml>

And the contents of that .wmls document are:

extern function helloWorld()
{
  WMLBrowser.setVar("message", "Hello World."); //Sets variable "message" to "Hello World."
  WMLBrowser.refresh(); // Refreshes the WML document to display the new message
}
