= Myriad Group =

- Industry: Mobile communications, software applications
- Founded: 2009
- Parent: Purple Labs
- Website: myriadgroup.com

Myriad Group AG, headquartered in Switzerland, is a software company specializing in the mobile communications sector. The company provides a range of applications tailored for consumer use, as well as solutions related to social media, messaging, and embedded software. These offerings are targeted towards Original Equipment Manufacturers (OEMs), mobile operators, and pay TV providers. Myriad organizes its operations into three distinct product divisions: Versy, Myriad Connect, and Device Solutions.

== History ==
The origins of Myriad Group AG trace back to the year 2009, when it was established through a merger between Purple Labs and Esmertec. Following this amalgamation, the company expanded its product and service offerings to cater to Mobile Operators, encompassing features such as USSD self-service capabilities and graphical user interfaces (GUIs) designed for Java-enabled devices.

The position of chief executive officer was assumed by Stephen Dunford on December 4, 2012. He later resigned from this role on January 31, 2017. Following Dunford's departure, Philipp Bolliger was appointed as the current CEO of Myriad Group AG in June 2018.

=== Purple Labs ===
The founding of the company, known as Purple Labs, dates back to the year 2001 when it was established by Jean-Luc Botto, Dennis O'Donovan, Sebastien Soyer, and Jean-Marie Andre. Originating in France, Purple Labs had its headquarters located in Chambéry. The company was primarily engaged in the development and distribution of Linux-based software designed for mobile Original Equipment Manufacturers (OEMs) and Original Design Manufacturers (ODMs).

In October 2007, Simon Wilkinson was appointed as the chief executive officer, shortly following a significant venture capital funding round that garnered $14.5 million for the firm. A notable event occurred on June 30, 2008, when Purple Labs acquired the mobile phone client software division of Openwave, specializing in browser and messaging client technologies, for a sum of $32 million. Subsequently, on July 31, 2008, the company reached an agreement to acquire Sagem Communication's mobile phone software along with its associated engineering teams. The company further expanded its operations on April 16, 2012, through the acquisition of Synchronica plc.

In September 2012, a transitional phase saw James Bodha, Mike Grant, and Gary Bunney take on the roles of co-CEOs as the company searched for a new full-time chief executive officer.

== See also ==
- Dalvik Turbo virtual machine (compatibility layer for Android applications also known as Alien Dalvik)
