= Novarra Inc. =

American software company

Novarra, Inc.
- Type: Private
- Industry: Wireless Services, Mobile Internet Services
- Founded: 2000
- Fate: Acquired by Nokia
- Headquarters: Itasca, IL, United States
- Key people: Jayanthi Rangarajan, Bruce Simpson, President and CEO
- Website: Archived official website at the Wayback Machine (archived 2011-07-14)

Novarra was a mobile internet software company founded in 2000 and based in Itasca, Illinois, United States. It created web-based services such as web internet access, portals, videos, widgets and advertising for mobile devices. Novarra provided access to the internet and other services through wireless handsets, PDAs and laptops and sold directly to operators, mobile handset manufacturers and internet brand companies. In 2010, Nokia acquired 100% of Novarra's shares.

== History ==
Novarra started in 2000 and launched its first wireless web software application in 2002 to enable mobile workforce users with Palm (PDA), BlackBerry, Symbol and Windows Mobile devices to securely access and customize corporate applications through wireless networks.

In 2002, Novarra’s received the first handset manufacturer contract to supply a full browser to Palm, Inc. for Tungsten (handheld) PDAs (branded WebPro).

In 2004, Novarra’s first mobile network operator deployment with U.S. Cellular marked the launch of the BREW (Binary Runtime Environment for Wireless) version of its browser platform and the first mobile operator in the world, to provide open internet access on all handsets. Previous to that mobile consumers would pay for bite sized content in the form of "WAP" sites which were a referred to as a "walled garden" of content controlled by the Mobile Operators. This was similar to the current "app" ecosystems on iOS and Android application stores.

In 2005, the company deployed its J2ME version of the Java Platform, Micro Edition browser client which was later adopted by several of Hutchison 3G Group's operating companies. It was branded as www3 in Italy and 3Xplorer in Hong Kong. The company's main competitor Opera emerged, by releasing its first version of a Java-based client called Opera-mini.

In 2007 Novarra secured venture capital from Qualcomm and other investors to expand into Asia. Also, their streaming internet video service was launched with 3 Hong Kong and Vodafone United Kingdom utilized Novarra for an update to Vodafone Live! that included an integrated portal, search and open internet access service for all phones. As a first of its kind, this service received much criticism from mobile developers.

In 2008, Novarra took steps to provide guidance for mobile developers when deploying a similar service at Verizon Wireless (also this deployment caused criticism by the community of mobile developers) and is a member of the World Wide Web Consortium Mobile Web Best Practices Working Group.

In 2009 Novarra's Jayanthi Rangarajan steps down to COO and the firm cuts 20% of manpower. The company also began reporting mobile internet usage statistics from deployments.

In 2010, Novarra was acquired by Nokia and was launched as the browser on Series 40 mobile phones. The cloud-based browser platform was eventually rebranded as Nokia Xpress for Nokia Asha Platform devices, also available as a secondary browser for Nokia Lumia smartphones via download from Windows Phone Store.

In 2014, the bulk of Novarra's team was acquired by BMW Technology Group to develop its BMW Connected and Open Mobility Cloud services.

Novarra customers used some or all elements of its Vision Mobile Internet & Multimedia Platform which included:

Vision Mobile Client for feature phones & smartphones Vision Cloud Platform for Content Transformation On-device Portal Customization Toolkits Video & Multimedia Server Widgets Mobile Broadband Optimization Advertising and Analytics

== Products ==
Novarra Vision Mobile Internet & Multimedia Platform may include any of the components below:

- Vision Mobile Browser for feature phones, smartphones, or emerging market phones
- On-device Portal
- Content Transformation Server
- Video & Multimedia Transcoding
- Widgets
- Mobile Broadband Optimization
- Advertising and Analytics

== Criticism ==
Together with Vodafone UK, Novarra has been heavily criticized by mobile web developers in the UK and elsewhere for its disputable practice of removing key device information from the HTTP headers of requests from mobile devices. While this practice makes viewing of sites with no mobile version possible on devices with limited or no HTML capabilities, it can also hinder developers' efforts to deliver a user-experience tailored to the capabilities of the requesting mobile device.

== Market Adoption ==
Mobile internet access services based upon the Novarra Vision mobile internet and multimedia platform have been deployed in the US, Europe and Asia by service providers including Yahoo, Vodafone, Verizon Wireless, Turkcell, Hutchison 3G, Sprint Nextel, US Cellular and others on mobile phones, smartphones and PDAs from Nokia, LG Group, Samsung Mobile, Motorola Mobile Devices, Palm (PDA), Research In Motion, ZTE Corporation, Sony Ericsson, Kyocera Wireless, and other manufacturers.
