= Minimo =

Mobile mozilla web browser

- Developer: Mozilla Foundation
- Release: February 18, 2004
- Final release: 0.2 (Windows CE) / March 31, 2007; 19 years ago
- Written in: C
- Operating system: Various Linux distributions and Windows CE
- Type: Mobile browser
- License: MPL/GPL/LGPL tri-license
- Website: www-archive.mozilla.org/projects/minimo/

Minimo (from "Mini Mozilla") was a project to create a version of the Mozilla web browser for small devices like personal digital assistants and mobile phones.

The project aimed to make it easier for developers to embed parts of Mozilla into systems with limited system resources (for example, machines with low amounts of RAM).

== Background ==
The Minimo Project was created to test the feasibility of porting a full-function desktop browser engine to advanced mobile devices.

To minimize the use of system resources Minimo initially did not include some of Mozilla's functionality, such as support for SVG, although continuing experiments sought to include all the features of the Mozilla codebase. In addition, the browser used small screen rendering technology to reformat Web pages for pocket-sized displays and allowed a platform for UI experiments on mobile devices. The user interface was designed to take up minimal screen space, with a single 8px high toolbar and a hidden-by-default address bar. Other user interface functionality, such as bookmarks, history, and search, was migrated into a special homepage called the Homebase. Because Minimo is based on the Gecko infrastructure, developers can decide to build specific versions and evaluate other features such as the canvas, SVG support, and more.

Chris Hofmann created the Minimo project shortly after leaving Netscape Communications in 2003, under funding from Nokia's Maemo team. He single-handedly saved the project from being canceled many times. Currently Chris works for the Mozilla Corporation. Chris was also responsible for some of the Minimo key features such as the Homebase bar, a format for displaying bookmarks more amenable to mobile devices.

Early Minimo development centered on ARM devices (such as Hewlett-Packard's iPAQ) with around 64MB of RAM, running Familiar Linux and the GPE Palmtop Environment (where it was the default browser). Minimo 0.1 was released for this platform in 2004.

The lead Minimo developer, Doug Turner, headed this and additional Mozilla mobile projects such as the Mozilla labs project named Joey. The Mozilla Foundation hired Turner in December 2004 to work full-time on Mobile projects. Minimo was funded by Nokia and others. Nokia's involvement became public in mid-2004. Chris and Doug teamed up with web developer Marcio Galli as he focused in user interface aspects and mostly creating built in applications for Minimo using HTML instead of XUL — these were refereed in the source code as extensions but served as concept for web-based mobile apps featuring Flickr, Google Maps, and more.

A Windows CE version of Minimo was created for Pocket PC 2003 software development kit. The first public build of Minimo for Windows CE was made available in February 2005.

In June 2006, the 0.16 release of minimo included tabs, a "homebase bar" for fast navigation to frequently used web sites, and featured support for many advanced web development capabilities that made the mobile browser easier to use.

On December 17, 2006, Turner, in his blog, acknowledged the slow pace of development, and revealed that Mozilla developers were exploring alternatives for Gecko-based web browsing on mobile handsets. Turner issued an invitation for others to "step up" as his own development priorities shift.

Version 0.2 came out in March 2007 and represented a product targeted for mobile developers. Minimo 0.2 included and upgraded interface, and support for Windows Mobile 5.

On November 27, 2007, project head Doug Turner announced that the project was no longer supported.

By 2008 Doug Turner had begun on yet another mobile web browser, this time known as Firefox Mobile or Fennec.

== Criticism ==
Probably because it was in the early stages of development, the Windows Mobile version of Minimo performed significantly slower than expected.

The quality of rendered pages is congruent with the well-respected layout engine it implemented (Gecko), but the program had very high memory and hardware requirements compared to what was typically available on most handheld platforms (e.g. 64 megabytes of RAM, 206–624 MHz ARM-compatible CPU).

Version 0.2 was recommended for developers targeting mobile devices or interested in AJAX- and Web Services-driven Web application for the mobile space. Minimo was compatible with many Web 2.0 applications, such as Gmail.

== See also ==
- Firefox for Android
- Mobile browser
- List of web browsers
- Comparison of web browsers
