= WinWAP =

Web browser

- Developer: Winwap Technologies
- Release: 1999
- Stable release: 4.1 / August 2008; 18 years ago
- Operating system: Cross-platform
- Type: Browsers
- License: Proprietary
- Website: Winwap.com

WinWAP was a web browser for Windows CE mobile devices. It was developed by the Finnish company Winwap Technologies. WinWAP was first released in 1999. It allowed users to access the internet via Wireless Application Protocol (WAP).
