= Steel (web browser) =

Discontinued web browser

- Steel 0.0.5 displaying English Wikipedia with both toolbars pulled out
- Original author(s): Michael Kolb
- Developer(s): kolbysoft
- Initial release: December 5, 2008
- Stable release: 0.1.9 / December 10, 2009; 15 years ago
- Written in: Java
- Operating system: Android
- Size: 249 KB
- Available in: English
- Type: Web browser
- License: Freeware
- Website: kolbysoft.com

Steel is a discontinued freeware web browser developed by Michael Kolb under the name kolbysoft. It is a fork of the default browser for Android, taking its WebKit-based layout engine and providing what is intended to be an easier and more "touch friendly" user interface.

Steel was one of the first Android applications to support automatic rotation based on the hardware's accelerometer and a virtual keyboard. This feature is now more common among Android applications.

In 2010 Skyfire purchased kolbysoft and the Steel browser.

== Features ==
Steel's user interface (UI) is intended to be more "touch friendly" than that of Android's default browser, and thus emphasizes ease of use on a touch screen. Back, forward, zoom, and bookmark-related buttons are all on the bottom toolbar. A URL-entry box is on the top toolbar, and beside it is a refresh/stop button, which displays if a page is fully loaded or still loading, respectively. Both toolbars are only shown if "pulled out" by two semi-transparent handles at the top and bottom of the display, and after a short period of not being used will hide themselves again. Until 0.0.4, Android's status bar containing system information was only shown when the top toolbar was out. Starting in 0.0.4, it is either visible or not depending on whether the browser is set to run in fullscreen mode.

=== Hardware controls ===
Steel will switch between portrait and landscape modes based on which way the device running it is rotated. By contrast, the Android default browser at the time of release required the user to "Flip Orientation" in a menu or, on the T-Mobile G1, open the phone's keyboard.

In an attempt to avoid opening the aforementioned keyboard when possible, Steel has a virtual keyboard which appears when a user selects a text box or the URL entry box in the toolbar. It is modeled after that of the iPhone, and as of version 0.0.4 causes the device to vibrate when a key is successfully pressed.

== Reception ==
Steel's first public release received a 3-star rating from AppVee, praising its user interface and accelerometer support but pointing out that it was not at its development stage an application to rely on fully.

Shortly after the release of 0.0.3, which added multiple features including the virtual keyboard, on December 13, 2008, Steel became the second most popular communication app in the Android Market, with an average rating of 4 (out of 5) stars from users.

In May 2009 an Android Tapp review gave the Steel Browser a 4.5/5 rating, saying that it had a "hands down a better UI for the browser."
