= 360 Web Browser =

Mobile Web Browser

360 Web Browser is a web browser created by Digital Poke for the iOS operating system. It was launched in October 2010.

360 offers tabbed browsing, downloading, Firefox sync, themes, file manager and Unrar/Unzip capabilities.

The major competitors of 360 Web Browser are Safari, Google Chrome, Atomic and Mercury.
