= Dolphin Browser =

Web browser for Android and iOS

- Screenshot of Dolphin Browser on an Android phone
- Developer: MoboTap Inc. (subsidiary of Changyou.com Limited)
- Engine: Dual engines with Webkit and Dolphin Jetpack (based on Webkit)
- Operating system: Android, iOS
- Type: Mobile browser
- License: Proprietary Freeware
- Website: dolphin.com

The Dolphin Browser is a web browser for the Android and iOS operating systems developed by MoboTap. It was one of the first alternative browsers for the Android platform that introduced support for multi-touch gestures. Dolphin Browser uses its native platform's default browser engine.

== Features ==
Dolphin Browser supports most web standards. The browser also supports tabbed browsing, voice controls, and touch gestures. It can cache web content for offline use and synchronize data across devices. It supports browser add-ons on Android only.

== Versions ==
Both iOS and Android versions are proprietary software with optional in-app purchases. There was an updated version called Dolphin Browser for Android 2.0 or later. Dolphin Browser Beta was released in May 2012 with the in-house HTML5 engine Jet pack. In December 2013, Dolphin Zero, a version of the app that claims to be private by automatically deleting browser data, was released.

== Privacy concerns ==
In October 2011, privacy concerns were raised about Dolphin browser after it was discovered that all URLs loaded in Dolphin HD were being relayed as plain text to a remote server, a process described by Ars Technica as "an unambiguous breach of privacy". This breach was patched in the next update.

== Reception ==
In 2011, Steve Kovach of Business Insider compared Dolphin Browser favorably to Safari and claimed "Dolphin Browser blows Safari out of the water." In 2011, Dolphin Browser was recognized on PC Magazine's list of the best free iPhone and iPad Apps of the year, and received a PC Magazine Editors Choice award in 2012.

However, in the years since its release it has not had enough users to compete with competitor mobile browsers. As of March 2024, the browser holds a rating of 2.7 out of 5 on the Apple App Store.
