= Video optimization =

Video optimization refers to a set of technologies used by mobile service providers to improve consumer viewing experience by reducing video start times or re-buffering events. The process also aims to reduce the amount of network bandwidth consumed by video sessions.

While optimization technology can be applied to videos played on a variety of media-consuming devices, the costliness of mobile streaming and increase in mobile video viewers has created a very high demand for optimization solutions among mobile service providers.

When streaming over-the-top (OTT) content and video on demand, systems do not typically recognize the specific size, type, and viewing rate of the video being streamed. Video sessions, regardless of the rate of views, are each granted the same amount of bandwidth. This bottlenecking of content results in longer buffering time and poor viewing quality. Some solutions, such as upLynk and Skyfire’s Rocket Optimizer, attempt to resolve this issue by using cloud-based solutions to adapt and optimize over-the-top content.

== History ==
The spike in mobile video streaming has come about as a result of the development of the smartphone. Smartphones registered a 5% to 40% market penetration between 2007 and 2010 in the United States. In the third quarter of 2011, smartphone sales increased by 42% from 2010.

Mobile operators are facing an explosion in Wireless data use, which is projected to grow 18-fold from 2011 to 2016 per the latest Cisco VNI forecast.

With the use of mobile devices increasing so rapidly, and almost half of the traffic on mobile internet networks being accounted for by video sessions, mobile service providers have begun to recognize the need to provide higher quality video access while using the lowest possible bandwidth.

With the release of the iPhone 5 in September 2012, it has been predicted that LTE networks might experience decreased data speeds as streaming multimedia begins to tax the 4G network. Cloud-based content optimizers that reduce the strain of over-the-top multimedia streaming could provide potential relief to mobile providers.

== Techniques ==
Since 2009, multiple solutions have been applied to the issue of video optimization.

=== Pacing ===
A variety of techniques used for reducing traffic over a mobile network infrastructure is called pacing. Pacing is a special form of rate limiting, where traffic delivery to a device is slowed down to a point, that "just in time" delivery takes place. The idea behind pacing is to avoid traffic bursts and even the data flow. If an object is delivered in its entirety, pacing provides no benefit. Where pacing can offer savings is when the object is "abandoned" part way through. When abandonment occurs, the portion of the object left in the receiving device buffer is effectively wasted.

=== Transrating ===
Another technique used in video optimization is known as video transrating, which involves modifying the video input stream. This modification is accomplished through an analysis of either "content" (to determine if bit rate on a particular video can be lowered without altering viewing quality), "device" (to recognize a specific streaming device and reduce bit rate based on resolution and screen size), or "network" (in which conditions of the network are estimated and adjustments in bit-rate are made to accommodate to varying network speeds without detracting from viewing experience). Average transrating savings are typically less than 30% per video. Transrating only allows modification to video quantization parameters and does not allow for modifications to the video resolution, codec, and other parameters.

=== Transcoding ===
In contrast to transrating, transcoding converts data from one encoding to another. The two-step process of decoding and recoding digital media is typically performed to accommodate for specific target devices or workflows, but it can also be utilized for low-grade streaming optimization.

=== Full transcoding ===
Full transcoding offers optimization rates of 60-80% per video by completely decoding and recoding digital media while allowing for changes in codec and resolution. The flexible conversion techniques associated with full transcoding result in higher optimization savings without impacting the quality of the original media. While full transcoding is more taxing on central processing units than transrating, there are cloud-based solutions, such as Skyfire, that allow network architectures with inexpensive CPUs to utilize full transcoding.

=== Adaptive bitrate techniques ===
Adaptive bitrate (ABR) video streaming technology was implemented to solve some of the challenges with streaming high bitrate videos.

Videos streamed using traditional formats such as progressive download and RTSP have a common challenge; any given video must be encoded at a specific target bitrate (e.g., 500 kbps) – and that is the bitrate regardless of the access network over which it is delivered.

If the chosen target bitrate is too high, the video will not be delivered smoothly over lower-speed networks and there will be slow start times and re-buffering throughout the video. Even on fast networks like LTE 4G, slow start times and re-buffering will occur during times of congestion or high network utilization.

If the chosen bitrate is low, on the other hand, the video quality will be lower – thereby reducing the customer’s quality of experience.

There are a number of ways of dealing with these challenges. One way is to take the YouTube approach. YouTube uses HTTP progressive download, and makes multiple versions of the video available at different resolutions and bitrates. Users themselves can then select the quality / bitrate that works best for them. If stalling or rebuffering occur, then can select the next lower resolution and continue viewing the video.

Adaptive bitrate effectively automates these resolution / quality adjustments on behalf of the user. Each ABR video is encoded at multiple bitrates, each broken into "chunks" of varying lengths (e.g., Apple’s HTTP Live Streaming generally uses 10s chunks). If network bandwidth is insufficient to deliver the video at this bitrate, the client will request the next "chunk" to be at a lower bitrate; quality of video will be reduced, but re-buffering will be avoided. Conversely, if the network can deliver at higher than the current bitrate, the client will request the next chunk to be at a higher bitrate, and quality will increase.

=== Cloud ===
A newer approach is to perform video and multimedia optimization in "the cloud" – data centers either operated by the service provider or by a third party. The major benefits of this technique are that it allows smoother bit rate adaptation and utilizes transcoding and caching methods to distribute resources only when and where they are needed.
