= Skyfire (company) =

American software company

- Type: Private
- Industry: Telecom
- Founded: 2007
- Founder: Nitin Bhandari, Erik Swenson, Co-Founders
- Headquarters: Mountain View, California, USA
- Area served: Worldwide
- Key people: Nitin Bhandari (CEO)
- Products: Rocket Optimizer, Skyfire Horizon
- Number of employees: 50+
- Parent: Otello Corporation
- Website: Archived 2014-12-26 at the Wayback Machine

Skyfire is a software company founded in 2007, and acquired by Opera Software ASA, now Otello Corporation, in 2013. In 2015, the company became the Network Solutions division of Opera, and ceased using the Skyfire brand name. They offer network optimization technologies including video optimization and monetization tools for carriers. Skyfire discontinued its Skyfire Web Browser in 2014 in order to consolidate its focus on its mobile operator technology. Skyfire was funded by venture capital, and was acquired by Opera Software ASA in March 2013.

== History ==
Skyfire was found in 2007 by Nitin Bhandari and Erik Swenson. The company was originally named DVC Labs but changed their name in 2008.

Skyfire received initial funding of $4.8 million from Matrix Partners and Trinity Ventures in June 2007. Skyfire increased their funding in 2008 with an additional $13 million investment from Lightspeed Venture Partners, Matrix and Trinity. As part of the investment, a Lightspeed Ventures partner joined the board of directors. In January 2012, they received $8 million from Verizon Investments LLC, Matrix, Trinity, and Lightspeed. In 2010, Skyfire purchased Kolbysoft, which allowed them to extend their web browser for the Android marketplace with Kolby's Steel Web Browser. In October 2012, SkyFire raised $10 million in series D financing from Panorama Capital, which is a venture capital firm that spun out from JP Morgan Chase in 2006.

On February 15, 2013, Skyfire was acquired by Opera Software for $155 million—Opera primarily eyed Skyfire for its video optimization technologies, which complements its own content optimization technologies. In February 2015, the company ceased using the Skyfire brand name, and became the Network Solutions division of parent company Opera Software ASA.

== Technology ==
Skyfire offers two main products: its Rocket Optimizer video, audio and multimedia optimization software and Skyfire Horizon browser extension platform.

=== Rocket Optimizer ===
Skyfire's Rocket Optimizer is a platform used by wireless operators to optimize video and images and save bandwidth while allowing multimedia, particularly video, to load more smoothly at times of poor wireless connectivity. It can optimize most unencrypted online videos in real-time. It optimizes based on device type and network congestion levels. It does so by performing greater and best optimization for smaller screen sizes with minimal impact on the end user and optimizes more heavily when networks are experiencing higher traffic rates. Rocket Optimizer 3.0 is the most recent version of Skyfire's carrier-grade network video and data optimization platform, and was launched in January 2013. It offers real-time optimization of mobile video to enable smoother streaming, and allows for the ability to measure, quantify and then mitigate congestion down to a per-stream level. The platform also supports video formats, including MP4 (which comprises most HTML5 and iOS video). It can be used on both 3G and 4G LTE networks.

=== Skyfire Horizon ===
Skyfire's Horizon is a web browser extension framework to the native smartphone browser. The toolbar is a fully customizable web-based operator portal embedded in the default browser of new smartphones. It offers extensions that can be customized by mobile and end users. It includes a web-based management portal that allows an operator to define extensions via the cloud without needing to update client software. It allows personal services to users and also ad serving capabilities. The product is currently deployed on multiple tier one carriers in North America, and is in numerous trials across the U.S. and Europe.

In October 2012, Sprint added Skyfire Horizon to their Pinsight Media+ promotion, and its upcoming Android devices.

=== Skyfire Web Browser ===
Skyfire Web Browser was a downloadable mobile web browser which rendered requested web pages on a proprietary server and relayed them to the browser on the end user's mobile phone, which then displayed the content.

It comprised two distinct generations of mobile browser technology. In the first generation (1.x) browser, a web page was fully rendered by a server separate from the mobile device, similar to the operation of a thin client. This approach is also used by Opera Mini. The second generation (2.x) browser employed a hybrid approach, using a conventional rendering of web pages on the handheld device, but streaming video from Skyfire's servers.

The browser received the Webby "People's Voice Award for Best Mobile Application" in 2009. and was also recognized in 2010 by PC World as the World's Best Third-Party Android Browser. and was named the "#2 Android App of All Time" by Tech Crunch. In 2011, it was named the "Top iPad Utility" by Apple.

The Skyfire Web Browser was supported on iOS, Android, SymbianOS and Windows Mobile devices before being discontinued in May 2014.

== Awards ==
Skyfire was recognized as one of the top ten startup companies to watch by Light Reading's in 2011. The company was also listed by Red Herring for being one of the top 100 most innovative companies in 2012. Skyfire won a grand prize in the 2012 TIA Venture Network Challenge. The company also won Best in Show at the 2013 Fierce Innovation Awards for Rocket Optimizer.
