= Arc (web browser) =

Freeware web browser

- Interface of Arc on macOS
- Developer: The Browser Company (Atlassian)
- Release: 25 July 2023; 3 years ago

Stable release(s)
- macOS: 1.142.1 / 9 April 2026; 6 months ago
- Windows: 1.101.0 / 9 April 2026; 6 months ago
- Written in: Swift
- Engine: Blink, V8 (WebKit on iOS)
- Operating system: Android 10 and later; iOS 16 and later; macOS 13 and later; Windows 10 and later
- Successor: Dia
- Type: Web browser
- License: Proprietary software
- Website: www.arc.net

Arc is a freeware web browser that was developed by The Browser Company, an American startup company founded by Josh Miller and Harsh Agrawal and owned by Atlassian since 2025. It was first released in 2023 for macOS and is also available for Windows, iOS and Android. In 2025, a blog post announced that Arc would enter maintenance mode and no longer be actively developed, as the company shifted all focus to developing its new AI browser, Dia. Arc is still maintained through Chromium's security updates, but will be sunset December 22, 2026.

Arc is based on Chromium and is written in Swift. It supports Google Chrome's browser extensions and uses Google Search by default.

The browser was released on 19 April 2022 via an announcement on Twitter. It had previously undergone a beta test, with the roughly 100 testers involved bound to a non-disclosure agreement. Users are only able to use the browser after signing up to an Arc account with an email address.

== Design ==
Arc is designed to be an "operating system for the web", and integrates standard browsing with Arc's own applications through the use of a sidebar. The browser is designed to be customisable and allows users to cosmetically change how they see specific websites.

Arc lets the user pick the color they want it to appear in (either a static color or a color gradient) during installation. Speaking with Input magazine, Karla Cole (one of Arc's designers) stated that it's because the design team "wanted to play with the feeling you get as a movie opens".

== Features ==
Arc uses a vertical sidebar to store all parts of the browser—including the search bar, tab list and bookmarks—aside from the viewing window. The sidebar also contains controls for audio playback, which can be accessed while not using the tab playing the audio. This functionality also works with video call software, such as Google Meet.

The search bar present in Arc, called Command Bar is similar in functionality and design to Apple's Spotlight feature. It can be used to search for websites and URLs as normal, as well as being able to pin tabs, duplicate tabs and access browser history. Arc includes an optional built-in ad blocker (uBlock Origin), and The Browser Company claims it does not share user's search data.

Tabs in Arc can be put into "spaces", organised tabs with separate areas that can be given different themes and browser profiles. Using the "Split View" feature, tabs in spaces can be put into a split screen view with up to four tabs per window. Tabs can also be pinned, which puts them in a labelled area in the sidebar. Unpinned tabs disappear after a period of time (which can be changed in settings) but can be retrieved in Arc's "archived tabs" section. Tabs can also be renamed.

Arc includes several built-in applications, including an "easel" function, which can be used to collect webpage screenshots and URLs. The easel includes tools for typing and drawing. Easels can be kept private, shared with other people for collaboration or posted online. There was previously also a notebook function, which could be accessed from the search bar. Aside from built-in applications, Arc also has integrations with other web applications, like Gmail and Google Calendar.

Arc lets users customise how they see websites using its "boosts" feature. Originally added in July 2022, boosts act similarly to browser extensions, but allow the user to fully customise their experience using CSS, HTML and JavaScript. A 2.0 update to boosts in 2023 added a simplified interface that allows the user to change website colors, change fonts and remove sections using the "zap" control. Boosts can be shared for use by other users as long as they do not use JavaScript, for security reasons. The Browser Company maintains a gallery of boosts they choose to display. Engadget described this feature as allowing users to "vandalise" websites.

Arc's "Air Traffic Control" feature lets users select which space a specific link will be opened at. Users can create what's called a "route" that defines which space the link will be opened when the link is opened from an external source.

In February 2024, The Browser Company announced the addition of three AI powered features. The first feature, "Instant Links", which was launched that same day, allowed users to instantly open multiple links by searching for the user's search query with AI, rather than having to go through a search engine to get to the pages. The two other announced features, "Live Folders" and "Arc Explore" were not launched initially, with the former being released in April 2024, while the latter has no specified release date.

The announcement also mentioned Arc Search, a new version of Arc for iOS, which released four days prior. The app was originally pitched as a "doorman for the Web," automatically opening a search box. The app included a "Browse for Me" function that would use AI to read webpages related to the user's query to create a new webpage containing quotes, summaries, and embedded videos regarding the query. The app also shipped with a built in ad blocker, which contained "always-on blocking of ads, trackers, GDPR popups, and banners." Since then, additional features have been added to Arc Search, such as "Pinch to Summarise," where Arc Search can summarise webpages. In May 2024 a feature named "Call Arc" was launched, allowing users to retrieve information from the web, via a spoken conversation with an AI, mimicking a phone call.

== Security ==
In September 2024, a security researcher discovered a vulnerability that would enable attackers to execute arbitrary code into any other users' browsing session with just a user ID. This exploit has since been patched.

== Platforms ==
Arc is available for macOS as a universal binary, Windows 11 (built in Swift, released on 30 April 2024) and Windows 10. A stripped-down companion app with only the sidebar functionality was released for iOS on 30 March 2023. Arc Search, the experimental Act II mobile browser, replaced that app as the only Arc mobile app on iOS in January 2024. In April 2024, Sidebar Sync for Arc Members was removed from the App Store, being fully replaced by Arc Search. In October 2024, Arc Search entered public beta on Android. Emails were sent to invited participants for the beta, but it was fully open on Google Play. In November 2025, a stable release was launched on Google Play.

The "Browse for Me" feature from Arc Search has been made available for Arc on desktop.

Arc for Windows is available on Windows versions 11 and 10, but does not support devices with processors older than Intel Haswell, AMD Athlon or AMD Ryzen.

== Reception ==
Arc has received generally favorable reviews from critics. How-To Geek gave the browser a 7/10, saying that "Arc has some excellent ideas and the confidence to lean into them [... but] feels like it needs a bit more polish to deliver a silky smooth browsing experience". David Pierce of The Verge agreed and said that "Arc isn’t perfect, and it takes some getting used to. But it’s full of big new ideas about how we should interact with the web — and it’s right about most of them". In an article published by Fast Company, Jared Newman called Arc the most polished of "all the attempts to reimagine the web browser". In an episode, David Imel of the Waveform Podcast said it was a "new take on the browser". Arc significantly contributed to the mainstream adoption of vertical tabs across desktop web browsers, including Google Chrome.

Chris Smith of BGR criticised the browser: "Arc is forcing you to create an account before you get to experience the browser at all. Google and Microsoft are dying for you to use their browsers while logged in. But they won’t force you to register an account if you don’t want to."

== Future ==
In October 2024, Miller announced that a planned redesign of Arc, formerly-dubbed "Arc 2.0", had been put on hold and that the browser would be maintaining its current feature set. He noted specific features (Arc's sidebar, spaces and pinned tabs) that users said they wished to keep when polled.

Miller said that Arc "isn't going anywhere" and would continue to receive stability updates and bug fixes but explained that the company felt a pivot to a new product focused around LLMs and AI was where they felt they should be heading. According to Miller, the new product was currently in the prototyping stage.

In December 2024, via a recruiting video, The Browser Company announced that their second product, a browser named Dia, will launch in "early 2025".

On 27 May 2025, The Browser Company's Josh Miller explained the reasons for stopping Arc development and focusing solely on Dia instead.

In September 2025, The Browser Company was acquired by Atlassian for $610 million in cash.

As of September 2026, Arc Search still receives new features, mainly on Android.

On October 22, 2026, The Browser Company announced that Arc would be discontinued on December 22, 2026, and encouraged users to move to its newer browser, Dia, which would replace the former. Arc Search would remain on iOS with limited functionality while the Android version would be discontinued.
