= Handheld Device Markup Language =

Markup language

HDML
- Handheld Device Markup Language
- Evolution of mobile web standards
- Abbreviation: HDML
- Native name: Handheld Device Markup Language
- Year started: 1996
- First published: 11 April 1997
- Latest version: HDML 2.0
- Organization: World Wide Web Consortium; Unwired Planet
- Authors: Peter King; Tim Hyland
- Related standards: HTML; WML (Wireless Markup Language)
- Website: www.w3.org/TR/NOTE-Submission-HDML-spec.html

Handheld Device Markup Language (HDML) is an obsolete markup language intended for display on handheld computers, information appliances, smartphones, etc. It is similar to HTML, but for wireless and handheld devices with small displays, like personal digital assistants, mobile phones and so on.

It was originally developed in about 1996 by Unwired Planet, the company that became Phone.com and then Openwave. HDML was submitted to W3C for standardization, but was not turned into a standard. Instead it became an important influence on the development and standardization of Wireless Markup Language (WML), which then replaced HDML in practice. Unlike WML, HDML has no support for scripts.

== See also ==
- Wireless Application Protocol
- List of document markup languages
- Comparison of document markup languages
