= About URI scheme =

Internal URI scheme

about is a URI scheme, implemented in various web browsers to reveal internal state and built-in functions. It is an IANA officially registered scheme, and is standardized.

The most commonly implemented about URIs are about:blank, which displays a blank HTML document, and about:, which in many browsers, will display information about the browser. Some browsers use URIs beginning with the name of the browser for similar purposes, and many about URIs will be translated into the appropriate URI if entered. Examples are opera (Opera) or chrome (Google Chrome). An exception is about:blank, which is not translated.

In early versions of Netscape, any URI beginning with about: that wasn't recognized as a built-in command would simply result in the text after the colon being displayed. Similarly, in early versions of Internet Explorer, about: followed by a string of HTML (e.g. about:<em>hello world</em>) would render that string as though it were the source of the page — thus providing a similar (though more limited) facility to the data: URI scheme defined by RFC 2397. Still other versions of Netscape would return various phrases in response to an unknown about URI, including "Whatchew talkin' 'bout, Willis?" (a catch phrase from the TV show Diff'rent Strokes) or "Homey don't play dat!" (from a recurring skit on the TV show In Living Color).

== Standardization ==
In 2010, and onwards, there are efforts to standardize the about URI scheme, and define the processing requirements for some specific URIs, in the IETF Applications Area Working Group (APPSAWG). In August 2012, it was published as an official Request for Comments as RFC 6694. The about URIs that have since been defined and assigned by IANA are listed below.

URI	Purpose
about:blank	References a blank HTML document with the media type text/html and character encoding UTF-8. This is widely used to load blank pages into browsing contexts, such as iframes within HTML, which may then be modified by scripts.
about:legacy-compat	A reserved, though unresolvable, URI defined within HTML5 intended for use in the DOCTYPE designed for compatibility with some legacy authoring tools, such as XSLT, which may not be capable of outputting the more common, shorter alternative that lacks both the PUBLIC and SYSTEM identifiers. <!DOCTYPE html SYSTEM "about:legacy-compat">.
about:srcdoc	A reserved, though unresolvable, URI defined within HTML5 intended to be the URI navigated to within iframes whose content comes from the srcdoc attribute.
about:invalid	References a non-existent document with a generic error condition. Intended for the case where a URL is necessary, but it should not be resolveable.
about:html-kind	Used as an identifier for kinds of media tracks.

== Common ==
Common "about:" URIs
URI	Purpose					
URI	Firefox, SeaMonkey, Mozilla	Google Chrome, Chromium	Konqueror	Opera	Edge	Internet Explorer
about:	Deprecated in Firefox 57 (Firefox Quantum)	Redirects to "chrome://version"	Redirects to "about:konqueror"	Redirects to "opera:about"	Redirects to "edge://version"	—N/a
about:about	Lists all the about: URLs (Firefox since version 4.0)	Redirects to "chrome://about"; Lists all the chrome: URIs (Works like "chrome://chrome-urls")	Redirects to "about:konqueror"	Redirects to "opera:about"	Redirects to "edge://edge-urls"	—N/a
about:blank	Shows a blank document					
about:plugins	Shows the filename, MIME type, description, suffix, and status of all installed plug-ins	Deprecated in Chrome 57	Shows the filename, MIME type, description, suffix, and status of all installed plug-ins	Redirects to "opera:plugins"	—N/a	—N/a
about:cache	Shows information about the Cache Service.	Deprecated in Chrome 66	Redirects to "about:konqueror"	Redirects to "opera:cache"	—N/a	—N/a
about:mozilla	Shows a page from the fictional Book of Mozilla. In some versions of Netscape, also replaced the meteors in the standard Netscape throbber with a large fire-breathing lizard.	—N/a	Redirects to "about:konqueror"	—N/a	—N/a	Shows a blank HTML document with a blue background. Removed in Windows XP SP2. (The blue page can still be seen at "res://mshtml.dll/about.moz" instead.)

== Chrome and Chromium derivatives ==
The following applies to all web browsers that derive from the Chromium project, including Google Chrome, Microsoft Edge, Opera, and Vivaldi.

Chrome-specific "about:" URIs
URI	Purpose
about:cache	Deprecated in version 66
about:crash	Crashes the current rendering process. (This causes the "Aw, snap!" crash notification page to be displayed.)
about:credits	Displays the list of free and open source software used in the browser, and their associated licenses.
about:dino	Displayed when the browser cannot connect to the target URL, this page contains an Easter Egg: Pressing the Space Bar key starts the _Dino_ minigame, which involves making a dinosaur jump over obstacles. Microsoft Edge doesn't feature this page, having replaced it with about:surf (see below.)
about:dns	Displays the DNS records
about:flags	Displays a page where experimental features can be configured by setting feature flags.
about:gpu	Displays information about WebGL and hardware accelerated graphics.
about:histograms	Displays histograms
about:inducebrowsercrashforrealz	Crashes the Google Chrome browser. This is designed for developers to test what happens when the Google Chrome browser crashes. Additionally, crashes Chromebooks entirely due to them running on Google Chrome.
about:internets	On particular versions of Windows, displays a page entitled "Don't Clog the Tubes!" which renders a page with an animation of the Microsoft Windows "3D Pipes" screensaver. Does not work on Windows Vista due to the pipes screen saver no longer being supported for releases after the 2.0.169.1 release.
about:kill	Same as about:crash, but with a violet background color and the message "He's Dead, Jim!" Occurs when the OS runs out of memory or the browser is killed by an external cause, such as the OS shutting down.
about:labs	Moved to about:flags in Chrome Dev channel 8.0.552.11
about:memory	Displays the process manager
about:net-internals	Provides an interface for monitoring the network usage and performance statistics
about:plugins	Shows installed plug-ins (Deprecated in Chrome 57)
about:sandbox	Shows which sandbox protection mechanisms are currently enabled.
about:shorthang	Hangs the tab's process, making it become unresponsive. This is designed for testing the hanging protection.
about:stats	Displays statistics about processes. At the top of the page, it states "Shhh! This page is secret!"
about:version	Displays version information, same as about:

The above list is not exhaustive; for a full list, see about:about URI.

== Firefox ==
Many of these can also be used in Thunderbird, by setting them as the "Mail Start Page". Also, some extensions define additional about: URIs not listed here.

Mozilla-specific "about:" URIs
URIs	Purpose	
URIs	Firefox	SeaMonkey, Mozilla Application Suite
about:addons	Shows installed addons, plugins, themes, and provides an interface for installing new addons (Firefox 4+ and SeaMonkey 2.1+)	
about:app-manager	Shows the Firefox OS Simulator (Removed in Firefox 36)	—N/a
about:bloat	Displays BloatView output (disabled in release builds). Superseded by about:memory on Gecko 1.9.2.	—N/a
about:bloat?new	TBA	—N/a
about:bloat?clear	TBA	—N/a
about:blocked	Shows the malware protection page used when the browser identifies a page as not safe for viewing (Firefox 3+)	—N/a
about:buildconfig	Shows the arguments and options used to compile the build in use	
about:cache	Shows information about the Cache Service. Number of entries, location of cache, size of cache, etc. for both memory and disk cache.	
about:cache?device=memory	Shows individual entries in memory	
about:cache?device=disk	Shows individual entries on disk	
about:cache?device=offline	Shows individual entries for offline viewing (Gecko 1.9+)	
about:cache-entry	Shows information about a cache entry. Used in about:cache links. Requires parameters.	
about:certerror	Shows the error page used when an SSL/TLS certificate is untrusted or otherwise invalid	
about:config	Shows an interface for viewing and setting a wide variety of configuration variables, many of which are not otherwise accessible through the GUI (options panels). The known earliest use of about:config dates back to Netscape 4.x, where it was not possible to edit the settings from the browser. about:config settings first became modifiable in Mozilla Application Suite. On first use, about:config displays a message which tells the user that the settings might void the warranty and they can be "Harmful to the stability, security, and performance of this application." The message about voiding one's warranty is a joke, as Mozilla Firefox ships without a warranty of any kind. The message has a checkbox to turn it off.	
about:crashes	Shows details of crashes submitted by Mozilla's crash reporter (Firefox 3+, SeaMonkey 2.0+)	
about:credits	Shows a list of all those who contributed to Mozilla	
about:devtools	Shows the welcome page used by Firefox Developer Tools	
about:downloads	Shows a list of downloaded files	
about:feeds	Shows the page used when clicking the rss feed icon in the address bar	
about:healthreport	Shows the Firefox Health Report	
about:home	Shows the Firefox 4 default home page	—N/a
about:jetpack	Shows an interface for viewing and setting the JetPack extension	—N/a
about:licence	The equivalent of about:license in the British English localizations of Firefox. (See American and British English spelling differences). Not available since Firefox 4.	
about:license	Shows the Mozilla Public License (and the Netscape Public License) for the piece of software (Gecko 1.8+)	
about:logo	Shows the logo used on the about: screen	
about:memory	Shows memory usage (Firefox 3.6+)	
about:mozilla	Easter egg, shows a verse from The Book of Mozilla	
about:neterror	Shows the error page used when the browser could not access the requested path	
about:newaddon	This URI is not registered. However, when the user tries to sideload an add-on, a dialog box bearing this URI appears. asking for the user's explicit consent.	—N/a
about:newtab	Shows a grid of favourite and most-visited websites (Firefox 13+)	
about:permissions	Shows permissions for all sites on Firefox 6.0a1	—N/a
about:plugins	Shows installed, currently enabled plug-ins	
about:preferences	Shows the new preferences page	
about:profiles	Shows the profile management page.	
about:privatebrowsing	Can be used to switch to private browsing mode. It shows a message indicating that Firefox will not remember any history for the current session. Note: It does not show URI on the address bar	—N/a
about:reader?url=	Opens the specified URL in Reader Mode. For example, about:reader?url=http://example.com.	—N/a
about:rights	Shows licensing information	
about:robots	Easter egg, beginning with March 8, 2008 trunk builds. The title of a window cites the iconic phrase of The Day the Earth Stood Still. The page's prose cites Isaac Asimov's first law of robotics.	—N/a
about:sessionrestore	Shows an interface for viewing about last session.	
about:startpage	In Ubuntu, shows the Ubuntu start page with the current search engine (if the "Ubuntu Firefox Modifications – ubufox" add-on is installed)	
about:support	Shows troubleshooting information (Firefox 3.6+, SeaMonkey 2.1+)	
about:sync-tabs	Shows list of tabs from other computers. Requires enabled synchronization.	
about:tabcrashed	Contains the text displayed when a tab crashes. Added in Firefox 25.	—N/a
about:webrtc	Shows an interface for WebRTC internals	
about:welcome	Shows the welcome page used by Firefox	

== Opera (v1–15) ==
In Opera, about: is an alias for the opera: scheme; therefore all these URIs also work with about prefixed. User JavaScript is disabled for all URIs in the about: or opera: schemes as a security feature. These pages can, however, be styled using local stylesheets.

Despite using an Opera derivative, the Nintendo DS Browser does not support any of the following functions; the Nintendo DSi Browser, however, does support opera:about.

Opera-specific "about:" URIs
URIs	Purpose
opera:blank	Maps to about:blank
opera:about	Provides info about the browser and the configured paths
about:opera	Maps to opera:about
opera:cache	Shows the content of the cache
opera:config	Shows a page that allows changing of numerous browser preferences, many of which cannot be accessed through the normal Preferences window (Opera 9.0 and newer)
opera:drives	Shows the local drives of the host system
opera:history	Shows the content of the browser history
opera:historysearch	Shows the start page of internal search engine for the browser history (Opera 9.5 and newer)
opera:plugins	Shows installed plug-ins. Opera 11 and newer allow individual plug-ins to be disabled from this page.
opera:button	Defines a custom button as a set of Opera actions. (Note: This does not work directly, all button parameters as on CustomButtons need be specified.)
opera:help	Shortcut to the help directory. This can be either local or external.
opera:debug	Shows a page that allows changing of settings for remote debug of Opera via Opera Dragonfly (Opera 9.5 and newer)
opera:memdebug	Shows debug information about memory usage (Opera 9.5 and newer)
opera:webstorage	Shows the browser's Web Storage (Opera 10.5 and newer)
opera:webdatabases	Shows the browser's Web Storage databases (Opera 10.5 and newer)
opera:gpu	Shows information about hardware accelerated graphics and GPU support
opera:cpu	Displays CPU usage (Opera 12 beta and newer)

== Internet Explorer (6–11) ==
Internet Explorer about URIs are configurable in Windows. It is therefore possible that some of the listed URIs will not work on a particular computer. For example, "about:mozilla" was removed in SP2 (although the page can still be found at "res://mshtml.dll/about.moz"). These about URIs are sometimes used for spyware and adware, most notably in CoolWebSearch, which made about:blank display advertisements.

Any about URI that is not recognized by Internet Explorer redirects to a page saying "Navigation to the webpage was canceled."

Internet Explorer-specific "about:" URIs
URI	Purpose	Supported versions
about:home	Displays the user's home page.	6, 7, 9, 10, 11 (not 8)
about:desktopitemnavigationfailure	Displays the "navigation cancelled" page.	6–8
about:navigationcanceled	Displays the "navigation cancelled" page.	6–8
about:navigationfailure	Displays the "navigation cancelled" page.	6–8
about:noadd-ons	Appears when add-ons are disabled to notify the users of a change in their web browsing experience.	7–11
about:noadd-onsinfo	Contains information about add-ons and what they do.	7–11
about:offlineinformation	Informs the user that the current page cannot be viewed offline. Internet Explorer 9 and later do not support offline browsing.	6–8
about:postnotcached	Informs the user that the current page needs to refresh and any information entered in a form will have to be re-posted.	6–11
about:securityrisk	Informs the user not to browse with the current security settings because they may be harmful to the computer.	6–11
about:tabs	Informs the user about tabbed browsing. Internet Explorer shows this page upon creating a new tab if the "Open home page for new tabs instead of a blank page" setting is enabled.	7–11
about:inprivate	Appears when the use initiates InPrivate Browsing; contains information about this feature.	9–11
about:compat	Displays a table of sites and the document rendering emulation mode configured for maximum backward compatibility.	11
about:newsfeed	Displays Internet Explorer 11's signature start page. It contains a Microsoft Bing search bar at the top, followed by a customizable row of tiles pertaining bookmarked website, a row of news topic category selection links, and an infinitely scrolling news aggregation feed.	11

== Microsoft Edge Legacy (v20–44) ==
The following applies to Microsoft Edge Legacy version 20 through 44. For newer Edge versions, see the Chromium section.

Microsoft Edge Legacy-specific "about:" URIs
URI	Purpose
about:home	Shows the content that would be shown if the home button were pressed
about:flags	Displays a list of Developer Setting and Experimental features
about:start	Shows the customizable (default) start page.
about:config	Redirects to about:flags
about:tabs	Shows the (default) new tab page.
about:compat	Shows the Enterprise Mode list (if configured)
about:edge	Shows the Edge logo.
about:inprivate	Shows the inprivate information tab.
about:surf	A surfing game easter egg.

== GNOME Web ==
When GNOME Web (formerly Epiphany) used Gecko as its layout engine, all Firefox-specific about: URIs worked in it. After the adoption of WebKit as its layout engine, only the following URIs are supported.

GNOME Web-specific "about:" URIs
URI	Purpose
about:plugins	Shows installed plug-ins.
about:memory	Shows details about memory usage.
about:epiphany	Displays the following message: Il semble que la perfection soit atteinte non quand il n'y a plus rien à ajouter, mais quand il n'y a plus rien à retrancher. Translation: It seems that perfection is attained not when there remains nothing to add, but when there remains nothing to remove. — Antoine de Saint-Exupéry It is a quote from Chapter 3 of Saint-Exupéry's memoir Terre des Hommes (titled Wind, Sand and Stars in its English translation by Lewis Galantiere).
about:applications	Interface for managing the Web Application Mode, supported since release 3.2.
about:overview	Displays a grid of thumbnails for the more visited websites.
about:gpu	Displays information about WebGL and hardware accelerated graphics.
about:web	Displays the browser and its engine information, same as about:
about:incognito	Displays information about incognito mode. Is a blank page in non-incognito mode.

== Netscape ==
The about: URL originated in and has existed in all versions of Netscape browsers. It was originally added as an Easter egg to display information about the development team.

Older versions of the Netscape browser have an about:people URI that was similar to about:credits above, but it would redirect to Netscape's active employee listing. In addition, about:username, where username is the username of a Netscape employee, would redirect to the Netscape homepage of the employee specified. For example, about:jwz would redirect to http://people.netscape.com/jwz/ (not an active link). Not all employee pages were accessible through this scheme. Only developers who knew which file in the source tree and the encoding scheme used to obfuscate the directory of employee about entries could add their names.

Many other about: easter eggs existed, including the famous about:mozilla, and other less known ones that showed pictures of the Netscape mascot Mozilla in various foreign garb, such as about:deutsch showing Mozilla in Lederhosen.

Some versions of Netscape would display the browser history for the about:global URI.

== Others ==
- In Konqueror, any about URI except about:blank and about:plugins redirects to about:konqueror, which shows a friendly 'start' and navigation page.
- In Internet Explorer for Mac 5 was an offline Easter egg, accessible by typing 'about:tasman', showing the Acid1 test with the text replaced by the names of the developers.
- Safari only recognizes about:blank.
- Microsoft Outlook supports an additional outlook:today URI, which shows the Outlook Today Screen. This screen shows messages, tasks and appointments; it is also accessible from Internet Explorer. Outlook recognizes about:blank too, but no other "about:" URIs.
