= Mozilla (mascot) =

Mascot of Netscape Communications Corporation

Mozilla was the mascot of Netscape Communications Corporation and subsequently the Mozilla Foundation. The mascot has varied in appearance, and was retired from active use in 2012.

== History ==
=== Name ===
The mascot's name comes from a portmanteau of Mosaic, the original name of Netscape Navigator, and Godzilla. The name stood for "Mosaic killer", as the company's goal was to displace NCSA Mosaic as the world's number one web browser, and was used as the codename for Netscape Navigator 1.0. Programmer Jamie Zawinski came up with the name during a meeting while working at the company. The name "Mozilla" later became more prominent when it was used for the open source browser of the same name.

=== Green design ===
Initially the mascot took various forms, including that of an astronaut wearing a cyber visor called "Space boy", but the eventual choice of a Godzilla-like lizard went well with the theme of "crushing the competition", and paid homage to the origin of its name. This design rendered Mozilla in the form of a green cartoon lizard with a purple underbelly, designed by Dave Titus in 1994. Mozilla was featured prominently on Netscape's web site in the company's early years, but the need to project a more professional image (especially towards corporate clients) led to him being removed.

Mozilla continued to be used inside Netscape, though, often featuring on T-shirts given to staff or on artwork adorning the walls of the Netscape campus in Mountain View. When Netscape acquired the website directory NewHoo in 1998, they rebranded it the Open Directory Project with the nickname "DMOZ" (Directory of Mozilla) due to its similarity to the Mozilla project. A green and purple image of Mozilla was placed on every page of the site, which continued even after Netscape's disbanding when it was acquired by AOL.

=== Red design ===
Modern red Mozilla mascot

With the launch of the mozilla.org web site in 1998, the mascot was redesigned as a larger, fiercer red Tyrannosaurus rex. The new design was by Shepard Fairey of "Obey Giant" and Barack Obama "Hope" poster fame. By September 2012, the mascot – referred to as "the dino" and "he" – had been "retired from active duty", removed from official Mozilla branding, and replaced by a "Mozilla" wordmark, all lowercase and set in Meta Bold typeface. Subsequently, in July 2019, the latter had been replaced by "moz://a", in Mozilla's Zilla Slab Highlight typeface and within a rectangle of a tone or color contrasting with that of the lettering.

== See also ==
- Netscape
- Mozilla
- The Book of Mozilla
- List of computing mascots
- Category:Computing mascots
