= Howard Schmidt =

American computer security expert (1949 - 2017)

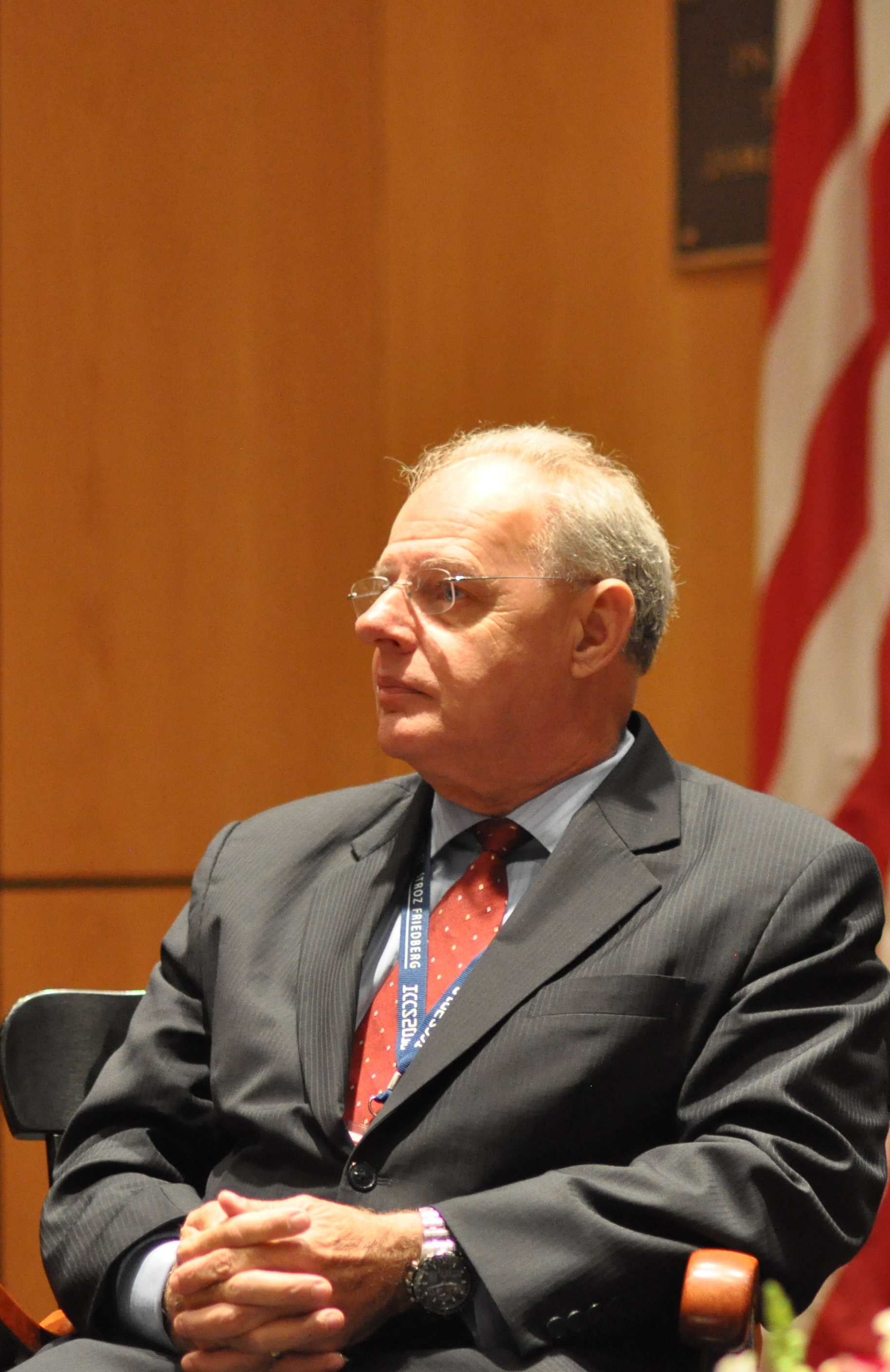

Cyber Security Coordinator of the Obama Administration
- In office January 20, 2009 – May 31, 2012
- President: Barack Obama
- Succeeded by: Michael Daniel

Personal details
- Born: Howard Anthony Schmidt; October 5, 1949 Philadelphia, Pennsylvania
- Died: March 2, 2017 (aged 67) Muskego, Wisconsin
- Spouse: Raemarie Schmidt
- Children: Four grown sons, 8 Grandchildren
- Education: University of Phoenix (B.S./M.A.)
- Occupation: Computer Security Specialist

Howard Anthony Schmidt (October 5, 1949 – March 2, 2017) was a partner with Tom Ridge in Ridge Schmidt Cyber LLC, a consultancy company in the field of cybersecurity. He was the Cyber-Security Coordinator of the Obama Administration, operating in the Executive Office of the President of the United States. He announced his retirement from that position on May 17, 2012, effective at the end of the month.

One of Schmidt's leading policy objectives was the development of "National Strategy for Trusted Identities in Cyberspace", which sought to enable private industry to create electronic identities that can be relied upon in cyberspace similar to the way that businesses rely on the combination of driver's licenses and credit cards to authenticate identities in physical space.

Prior to joining the Obama Administration, Schmidt served as President of the Information Security Forum and President and CEO of R & H Security Consulting LLC, which he founded in May 2005. He was also the international president of the Information Systems Security Association and the chairman of the board of the Finnish security company Codenomicon, the American security company Fortify Software, and the International Information Systems Security Certification Consortium, commonly known as (ISC)². In October 2008 he was named one of the 50 most influential people in business IT by readers and editors of Baseline Magazine.

Schmidt died of brain cancer on March 2, 2017, at his home in Muskego, Wisconsin.

== Education ==
Schmidt held a Bachelor of Science degree in business administration (1994) and a Master of Arts degree in organizational management (1998) from the University of Phoenix. He also holds an honorary doctorate degree in humane letters. Schmidt's certifications include CISSP and CISM. He was a professor of practice at the Georgia Institute of Technology's GTISC, professor of research at Idaho State University, adjunct distinguished fellow with Carnegie Mellon's CyLab, and a distinguished fellow with the Ponemon Institute.

== Biography ==
=== Public service ===
Schmidt began his government service in the United States Air Force in 1967, where he studied chemical weapons, high explosives, and nuclear weapons while attending munitions school. Between 1968 and 1974, Schmidt completed three tours of duty in Southeast Asia during the Vietnam War. He left active military duty in 1974, then started his civil service career at the Gila Bend Air Force Auxiliary Field, since renamed as the Barry M. Goldwater Air Force Range and served as chief of transportation and deputy director of resource management until 1982.

He served in the Arizona Air National Guard with the 161st Communications Squadron based at Phoenix International Airport, from 1989 until 1998.

Schmidt was a city police officer from 1983 to 1994 for the Chandler Police Department in Arizona where he served on the SWAT team and the Organized Crime and Drug Enforcement Unit, and formed and led the Special Enforcement Team. In 1994 he took a position with the FBI's National Drug Intelligence Center, where he headed the Computer Exploitation Team. After working at the FBI, in 1994, Schmidt joined the Air Force Office of Special Investigations (AFOSI) Computer Forensic Lab and Computer Crime and Information Warfare Division. as a supervisory special agent and director. In 1996, while serving in that position, he established the first dedicated computer forensic lab in the government, which was the basis for the formation of the Defense Computer Forensic Laboratory (DCFL).

In 1998, Schmidt transferred to the U.S. Army Reserves as a special agent, Criminal Investigation Division, where he was assigned to the Computer Crime Investigations Unit (CCIU). He has also served with the 315th MP Det (CID) at Ft. Lawton in Washington. He has testified as an expert witness in federal and military courts in the areas of computer crime, computer forensics and Internet crime.

In May 2003, Schmidt retired from the White House after 31 years of public service in local and federal government. After the 9/11 attacks, he was appointed by President Bush as the Vice Chair of the President's Critical Infrastructure Protection Board and as the special adviser for cyberspace security for the White House in December 2001. While at the White House, he assisted in the creation of the US National Strategy to Secure CyberSpace. He assumed the role as the chair in January 2003 until his retirement in May 2003, when he joined eBay.

On Tuesday, December 22, 2009, Schmidt was named as the United States' top computer security advisor to President Barack Obama. Previously, Schmidt served as a cyber-adviser in President George W. Bush's White House and has served as chief security strategist for the US CERT Partners Program for the National Cyber Security Division through Carnegie Mellon University, in support of the Department of Homeland Security. He has served as vice president and chief information security officer and chief security strategist for eBay.

In May 2012, Schmidt announced that he would be stepping down as the White House's CyberSecurity Coordinator at the end of the month, citing a desire to focus on family and pursue teaching in the cyber field. He was replaced by Michael Daniel, chief of the White House budget office's intelligence branch.

=== Private industry and professional organizations ===
Schmidt also had an active career in private industry and professional organizations.

In 1997, Schmidt joined Microsoft, as the director of information security, chief information security officer (CISO), and chief security officer (CSO). He was the co-founder of the Trustworthy Computing Security Strategies Group.

Schmidt served on the executive committee of the Information Technology Sector Coordination Council. His memberships include the High Technology Crime Investigation Association, the American Academy of Forensic Sciences and the International Association of Chiefs of Police. He has testified before congressional committees on computer security and cyber crime and has featured on various worldwide television and radio shows including, BBC, ABC, CNN, CNBC, Fox TV talking about cyber-security, investigations and technology. He is a co-author of The Black Book on Corporate Security and author of Patrolling CyberSpace, Lessons Learned from a Lifetime in Data Security.

Schmidt was the first president of the Information Technology Information Sharing and Analysis Center. He is a former executive board member of the International Organization of Computer Evidence, and served as the co-chairman of the Federal Computer Investigations Committee. He served as a board member for the CyberCrime Advisory Board of the National White Collar Crime Center, and was a distinguished special lecturer at the University of New Haven, Conn., teaching a graduate certificate course in forensic computing. He has also taught courses for the FBI and DEA on the use of computers and law enforcement investigations.

He served as an augmented member to the President's Committee of Advisors on Science and Technology in the formation of an Institute for Information Infrastructure Protection.

Schmidt has been appointed to the Information Security Privacy Advisory Board to advise the National Institute of Standards and Technology the Secretary of Commerce and the Director of the Office of Management and Budget on information security and privacy issues pertaining to federal government information systems.

Schmidt was also on the International Multilateral Partnership Against Cyber Threats (IMPACT) International Advisory Board.

== Publications ==
- Patrolling Cyberspace, Lessons Learned from a Lifetime in Data Security ISBN 0-9776895-2-2

== See also ==
See Category:Computer security for a list of all computing and information-security related articles.

- Information Security Forum
- Information Systems Audit and Control Association
