= Ronald Deibert =

Canadian academic (born 1964)

Ronald Deibert OC OOnt
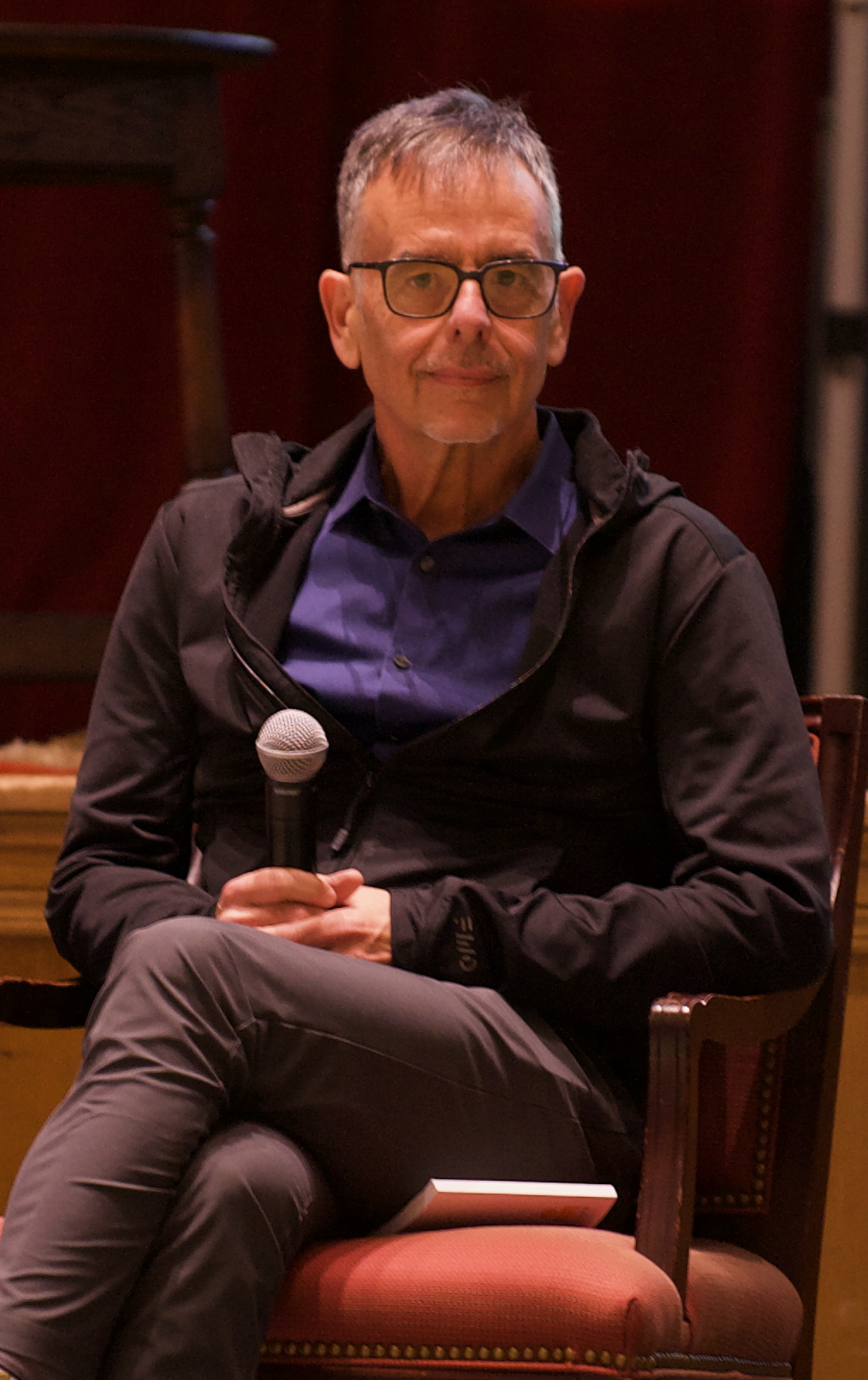
- Deibert at the Knight First Amendment Institute in 2024
- Education: The University of British Columbia (BA, PhD); Queen's University (MA)
- Occupations: Founding Director; Citizen Lab
- Employer: University of Toronto

Ronald James Deibert OC OOnt (born 1964) is a Canadian professor of political science, philosopher, founder and director of the Citizen Lab at the Munk School of Global Affairs, University of Toronto.

He was a co-founder and a principal investigator of the OpenNet Initiative and Information Warfare Monitor projects. Deibert was one of the founders and former VP of global policy and outreach for Psiphon.

== The Citizen Lab ==
As founder and director of the Citizen Lab, Deibert has overseen and been a contributing author to more than 170 reports covering research on cyber espionage, commercial spyware, Internet censorship, and human rights. The Citizen Lab has been remarkably effective in holding governments and private-sector firms accountable for using information technology to endanger people. Researchers from the Citizen Lab contribute to the global understanding of spyware abuse through their expertise. Writing for the Guardian in 2021, John Naughton said "Deibert has built a formidable team that functions as a kind of National Security Agency for civil society." The Citizen Lab is supported by individual donations, including support by Geoffrey Hinton.

== Massey Lectures ==
In 2020, he gave the annual Massey Lectures for the Canadian Broadcasting Corporation, and they were published in book form under the title Reset: Reclaiming the Internet for Civil Society. The book won the 2021 Shaughnessy Cohen Prize for Political Writing.

== Other work ==
Deibert presently serves on the editorial boards of the journals International Political Sociology, Explorations in Media Ecology, Review of Policy Research, Journal of Global Security Studies, and Astropolitics. He has served on the advisory boards of Access Now, Privacy International, the technical advisory groups of Amnesty International and Human Rights Watch, and is currently on the advisory boards of PEN Canada and the Design 4 Democracy Coalition, the steering committee of the World Movement for Democracy, the advisory board for the Citizen Clinic at the University of California, Berkeley, and co-chair of the University of Toronto's Information Security Council.

== Awards and nominations ==
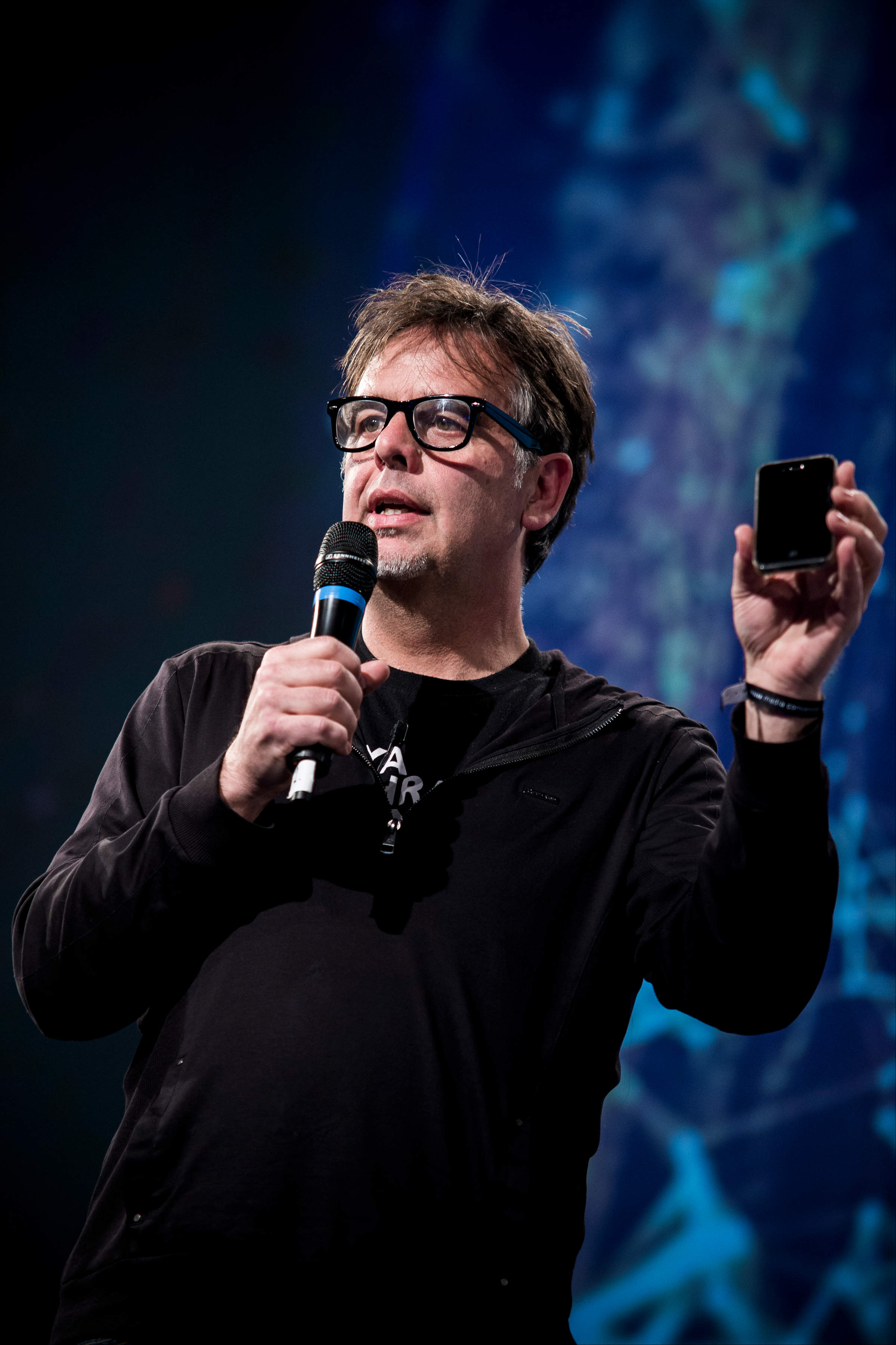
Deibert at re:publica conference, 2014

Deibert's work has been widely recognised and respected.He has been awarded the University of Toronto's President's Impact Award (2017), Foreign Policy's Global Thinker Award (2017), the Electronic Frontier Foundation Pioneer award (2015), the Neil Postman Award for Career Achievement in Public Intellectual Activity (2014), the Advancement of Intellectual Freedom in Canada Award from the Canadian Library Association (2014), the Canadian Journalists for Free Expression Vox Libera Award (2010), the Carolyn Tuohy Award for Public Policy (2010), the Northrop Frye Distinguished Teaching and Research Award (2003), and the University of Toronto Outstanding Teaching Award (2002). He was a Ford Foundation research scholar of information and communication technologies (2002–2004). In 2019, he received an honorary Doctor of Laws from the University of Guelph.

He was named a Global Thinker by Foreign Policy (2017), one of Motherboard website's "Humans of the Year" (2017), listed among SC Magazine's top "IT Security Luminaries" (2010), and Esquire magazine's Best and Brightest List of 2007.

In 2013, he was made a Member of the Order of Ontario and awarded the Queen Elizabeth II Diamond Jubilee Medal, for being "among the first to recognize and take measures to mitigate growing threats to communications rights, openness and security worldwide." He was appointed to the Order of Canada in 2022, with the rank of Officer.

Reset: Reclaiming the Internet for Civil Society won the 2021 Shaughnessy Cohen Prize for Political Writing.

== Publications ==
=== Co-edited by Deibert ===
- Access Denied: The practice and policy of Internet Filtering (MIT Press, 2008)
- Access Controlled: The shaping of power, rights, and rule in cyberspace (MIT Press, 2010)
- Access Contested: Security, Identity, and Resistance in Asian Cyberspace (MIT Press, 2011)

=== Authored by Deibert ===
- Parchment, Printing, and Hypermedia: Communications in World Order Transformation (New York: Columbia University Press, 1997)
- Black Code: Surveillance, Privacy, and the Dark Side of the Internet (Penguin Random House, 2013). Turned into a feature-length documentary Black Code by Nicholas de Pencier in 2016.
- Reset: Reclaiming the Internet for Civil Society (September, 2020) – Massey Lectures
- Deibert, Ronald J. (2025). Chasing Shadows: Cyber Espionage, Subversion, and the Global Fight for Democracy. Simon & Schuster. ISBN 978-1-6680-1404-2.
