= PICISOC =

The Pacific Islands Chapter of the Internet Society (PICISOC) serves the Internet Society’s purposes by serving the interests of the global Internet community through its presence in the Pacific Islands. In addition to ISOC interests, PICISOC also focuses on local issues and developments and acts as an impartial advisor to governments and the public on matters of significant interest to Pacific Island people concerning the Internet and ICT technology in general.

== History ==
IT-PacNet was created in 1994 to see what ICT developments were being made by FFA and SOPAC, two regional organisations operating in the Pacific. This meant comparing notes, implementations, and success stories. The meeting was informal and technical in nature. FFA's IT manager at the time was Sam Taufao, and SOPAC's IT manager was Leslie Allinson. It was agreed that more organisations should be brought into the group the following year. Slowly, it became apparent that the countries needed to be part of the process, and IT-PacNet evolved into a meeting of IT administrators and managers from the Pacific region.

At around the same time, Sam Taufao (then working for FFA) came back from a meeting sponsored by UNESCO and recommended the creation of PICISOC-the Pacific Islands Chapter of the Internet Society. IT-PacNet slowly evolved into a CROP (Council of Regional Organisations of the Pacific) ICT Working Group and concentrated more on dealing with CROP policies. Meanwhile, PICISOC grew, and by 2002, a board and executive were in place. The general assembly's (annual meetings) became bigger, and thus PacINET was born, and has since evolved to become the premier ICT conference for the Pacific region. PacINET was able to re-group most of the original functions of IT-PacNet, creating an event where anyone could speak freely and share views on ICT/Internet for any organisation (government, the private sector, etc.) or as an individual.

PICISOC's focus is on ICT and Internet issues for the Pacific Islands region, and it works with various organisations and governments to ensure the continuing development of ICT in the region.

== Board members 2014 ==
The Executive Board (2014–2015) is composed of:

- Edwin Liava'a (Chairperson), Lautoka, Fiji Islands
- Ellen Strickland (Vice-Chairperson – Policy), Auckland, New Zealand
- Priscilla Kevin (Vice-Chairperson - Technical), Port Moresby, Papua New Guinea
- Patrick Queet (Treasurer), Suva, Fiji Islands
- Maureen Hilyard (Secretary), Rarotonga, Cook Islands
- Jackson Miake(Board Member), Port Villa, Vanuatu
- Winifred Kula Amini (Board Member), Port Moresby, Papua New Guinea

== Board members 2013 ==
The Executive Board (2013–2014) is composed of:

- Maureen Hilyard (chairperson), Rarotonga, Cook Islands
- Ellen Strickland (vice-chairperson), Auckland, New Zealand
- Emani Fakaotimanava-Lui (secretary, Website), Alofi, Niue
- Louise Nasak (treasurer), Port Vila, Vanuatu
- David Leeming (membership director), Honiara, Solomon Islands
- ‘Etuate Cocker (Website, SIG relations), Auckland, New Zealand
- Andrew Molivurae (board member), Port Vila, Vanuatu

== Board members 2012 ==
The current Executive Board (2011–2012) is composed of:

- Maureen Hilyard (chairperson), Rarotonga, Cook Islands
- Andrew Molivurae (vice-chairperson), Port Vila, Vanuatu
- Ellen Strickland (secretary), Auckland, New Zealand
- Siaosi Sovaleni (treasurer), Tonga
- David Leeming (membership director), Honiara, Solomon Islands
- Will Tibben (Website & Apralo Rep), Wollongong, NSW, Australia
- Andrew Berquist (co-website manager), Pago Pago, American Samoa

== Annual conference ==
PICISOC organises a meeting called PacINET which serves as its annual conference and AGM.

PacINET is a regional conference for practitioners, developers, researchers and those interested in ICT from all sectors to exchange information on the system design, enabling technologies, and anecdotal experiences related to the use of ICT in the Pacific Islands. It has evolved to become the Pacific's largest annual ICT conference.

== Countries and territories covered ==
The chapter covers the following countries and territories: American Samoa - Cook Islands - Federated States of Micronesia - Fiji - French Polynesia - Guam - Kiribati - Marshall Islands - Nauru - New Caledonia - Niue - Northern Marianas - Palau - Papua New Guinea - Pitcairn - Samoa - Tokelau - Tonga - Tuvalu - Vanuatu - Wallis and Futuna
