= Classilla =

Web browser for Power Macintoshes

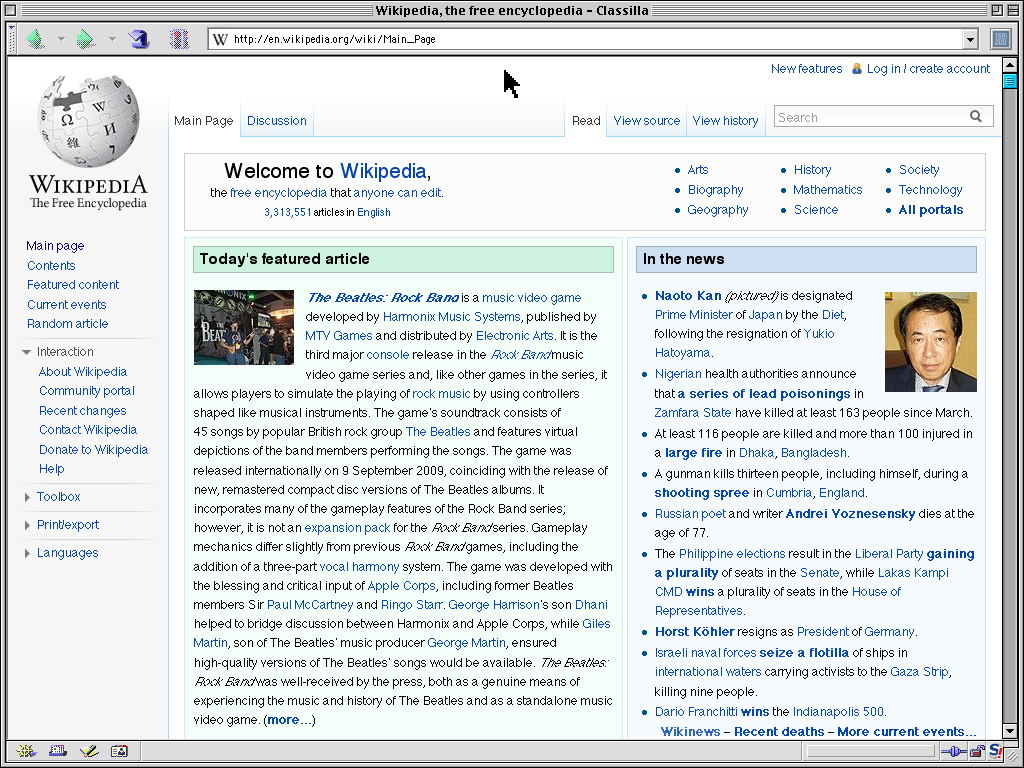
- Screenshot of Classilla 9.2 rendering the Wikipedia Main Page, on Mac OS 9.2.2.
- Developer: Cameron Kaiser
- Release: June 30, 2009; 17 years ago
- Final release: 9.3.4b1 / March 29, 2021
- Operating system: Classic Mac OS (Mac OS 8.6 and Mac OS 9); Mac OS X (10.1.5 Puma – 10.4.11 Tiger)
- Platform: PowerPC
- Type: Web browser
- License: Mozilla Public License, GNU General Public License, others (see about: within the browser)
- Website: classilla.org
- Repository: code.google.com/archive/p/classilla/source/default/source

Classilla was a Gecko-based Internet suite for PowerPC-based classic Macintosh operating systems, essentially an updated descendant of the defunct Mozilla Application Suite by way of the Mac OS port maintained in the aborted WaMCom project. The name is a portmanteau of Classic (the classic Mac OS, as defined by the Classic Environment), and Mozilla.

Like the Suite it is descended from, Classilla offers e-mail (POP/SMTP), Usenet (NNTP), Gopher, FTP and World Wide Web (HTTP) access, using a modified version of the Gecko layout engine called Clecko. Classilla also includes its own versions of the DOM Inspector, Mozilla Composer and Venkman components; the former IRC ChatZilla component was removed in version 9.1. Classilla was the last updated major browser for classic Mac OS systems, and the only Mozilla-based browser for that environment most recently in maintenance as well, as iCab 3's final update was 3.0.5 in January 2008, Opera's Mac OS 9 support ended with version 6.03 on 20 August 2003, Internet Explorer for Mac on the classic Mac OS ceased development with 5.1.7 in July 2003 and Mozilla itself ceased support in 2002 (see History).

The final version of Classilla was released in March 2021 and the suite is no longer officially supported. The developers considered the project to be alpha quality software. Classilla shared administration with TenFourFox, a fork of Mozilla Firefox for PowerPC-based Macs running Mac OS X Tiger and Mac OS X Leopard. The primary maintainer was Cameron Kaiser.

== History ==
Official support for Mac OS 9 (and Mac OS 8.6) in the Mozilla Application Suite ended with the release of Mozilla 1.2.1 in 2002, coincident with Apple ending support for their legacy operating system. However, many enthusiasts discovered that Mozilla 1.3.x would still generally build and run on the old Mac OS with modification apart from its dependencies on CarbonLib (Mozilla 1.4.x and newer will not build at all on Mac OS 8 or 9 without heavy modification), leading to builds such as Unofficial Mozilla for Mac OS 9, WaZilla 1.3f, and WaMCom. Of these, WaMCom was the arguably longest maintained, with its final release on 23 July 2003.

In May 2009, Cameron Kaiser announced his intentions to start porting later Mozilla updates back to the 1.3.1-based version used in WaMCom, christening his modified version as Classilla. This first version, given the version number 9.0 to match Mac OS 9 (with subsequent numbers matching OS 9 version numbers), was released on 30 June 2009.

On March 29, 2021, Kaiser released the final versions of both Classilla and TenFourFox and announced the cancellation of official support for both projects, citing increasing technical issues.

== Features ==
Owing to Classilla's unusual provenance (being essentially a heavily patched version of Mozilla 1.3.1; vestigial proof remains in its verse from The Book of Mozilla), it has more limited support for web standards than do later Gecko-based browsers such as SeaMonkey and Mozilla Firefox, and its layout compared to iCab 3.0.5 is objectively inferior as the latter browser is Acid2 compliant and Classilla is not. Similarly, it only scores 31/100 in Acid3. On the other hand, its layout capability is more current than WaMCom or Mozilla 1.3.1, and Classilla has a more modern JavaScript interpreter than iCab and better support for the Document Object Model (DOM) although it is also still deficient compared to mainline Gecko-based browsers. It is perceived by users to be more stable and quicker to render than iCab, important as the classic Mac OS relies on cooperative multitasking and has very limited support for memory protection — any application crash could hang the entire system. However, known problems in the browser and issues with performance on older machines led the developers to implement their own limited version of NoScript as a built-in part of the browser so that users had the ability to enable JavaScript only where it was safe or necessary to do so.

Classilla also adds support for user agent spoofing, which was not part of the original Mozilla suite, and repairs various classic Mac OS-specific bugs. In addition, Classilla 9.3.0 introduced the Byblos HTML rewriting engine that can rewrite individual pages at the source code level with browser- and user-provided "stele" scripts, with the intent of lightweight adaptation of complicated content to the capabilities or quirks of the browser. Starting with 9.3.0, Classilla presents a mobile user agent by default.

Apart from its upgraded support for Web pages, Classilla supports most of the same features that Mozilla of the same generation did, with similar feature sets and bugs in its support for e-mail, Usenet, FTP, and Gopher, although the latter received token upgrades. In a likewise fashion, Classilla also inherits many of the security failings of earlier versions of the Application Suite, many of which are still not patched and openly warned of by the developers. The presence of NoScript, along with the unusual nature of the classic Mac OS, is thought to add some level of protection, although it was the avowed goal of the developers to reach security parity with modern Mozilla-based releases and repair outstanding bugs.

== See also ==
- Mozilla Application Suite
- Mac OS 8 and Mac OS 9
- TenFourFox
- List of web browsers
- List of news clients
- List of HTML editors
- Comparison of web browsers
- Comparison of email clients
- Comparison of HTML editors
