= The Book of Mozilla =

Easter egg in Firefox and related web browsers

The Book of Mozilla is a computer Easter egg found in the Netscape, Mozilla, SeaMonkey, Waterfox and Firefox series of web browsers. It is viewed by directing the browser to about:mozilla.

There is no real book titled The Book of Mozilla. However, apparent quotations hidden in Netscape and Mozilla software give this impression by revealing passages in the style of apocalyptic literature, such as the Book of Revelation in the Bible. When about:mozilla is typed into the location bar, various versions of these browsers display a cryptic message in white text on a maroon background in the browser window.

There are eight official verses of The Book of Mozilla which have been included in shipping releases, although various unofficial verses can be found on the Internet. All eight official verses have scriptural chapter and verse references, although these are actually references to important dates in the history of Netscape and Mozilla.

The eight verses all refer to the activities of a fearsome-sounding "beast". In its early days, Netscape Communications had a green fire-breathing dragon-like lizard mascot, known as Mozilla (after the code name for Netscape Navigator 1.0). From this, it can be conjectured that the "beast" referred to in The Book of Mozilla is a type of fire-breathing lizard, which can be viewed as a metaphor for, or personification of Netscape.

While part of the appeal of The Book of Mozilla comes from the mysterious nature, a knowledge of the history of Netscape and Mozilla can be used to extract some meaning from the verses. Furthermore, the Book of Mozilla page has annotations for each of the first, second, third and fifth verses hidden as comments in its HTML source code. These comments were written by Valerio Capello in May 2004 and were added to the Mozilla Foundation site by Nicholas Bebout in October that year. Neither Capello nor Bebout are 'core' Mozilla decision-makers; and there is no evidence that Capello's interpretations received any high-level approval from the senior management of the Mozilla Foundation.

== The Book of Mozilla, 12:10 ==
The Book of Mozilla first appeared in Netscape 1.1 (released in 1995) and can be found in every subsequent 1.x, 2.x, 3.x and 4.x version. The following "prophecy" was displayed:

And the beast shall come forth surrounded by a roiling cloud of vengeance. The house of the unbelievers shall be razed and they shall be scorched to the earth. Their tags shall blink until the end of days. — from The Book of Mozilla, 12:10

The Book of Mozilla made its debut in an early version of Netscape Navigator.

The chapter and verse number 12:10 refers to December 10, 1994, the date that Netscape Navigator 1.0 was released.

The Book of Mozilla page, which includes seven verses from The Book of Mozilla, contains the following explanation in its HTML source code:

<!-- 10th December 1994: Netscape Navigator 1.0 was released -->
<!-- This verse announces the birth of the beast (Netscape) and warns bad coders (up to Netscape 3, when you watched the HTML source code with the internal viewer, bad tags blinked). -->

The "beast" is a metaphor for Netscape. The punishments threatened towards the "unbelievers" (most likely users who didn't conform to standards) are traditionally biblical but with the strange threat that their "tags shall blink until the end of days". This is a reference to a feature in early versions of Netscape that would make bad tags blink, as seen in the source code comments from the Book of Mozilla.

== The Book of Mozilla, 3:31 ==
On May 10, 1998, Jamie "JWZ" Zawinski changed The Book of Mozilla verse to reference the fact that Netscape had released its code as open source and started the Mozilla project. This verse was included in all Mozilla builds until October 1998, when a rewrite of much of the Mozilla code meant that the Easter egg was lost. On February 5, 2000, Ben Goodger, then working for Netscape, copied The Book of Mozilla verse across to the new code base. It was included in all subsequent Mozilla builds (until the introduction of the 7:15 verse), Netscape versions 6 to 7.1 and Beonex Communicator; it still appears in Classilla due to that browser's unusual history.

The verse states:

And the beast shall be made legion. Its numbers shall be increased a thousand thousand fold. The din of a million keyboards like unto a great storm shall cover the earth, and the followers of Mammon shall tremble. — from The Book of Mozilla, 3:31 (Red Letter Edition)

Screenshot of The Book of Mozilla, 3:31 (Red Letter Edition) in Netscape 6

The chapter and verse number 3:31 refers to March 31, 1998, when Netscape released its source code.

The Book of Mozilla page has the following comment in its HTML source about this passage:

<!-- 31st March 1998: the Netscape Navigator source code was released -->
<!-- The source code is made available to the legion of thousands of coders of the open source community, that will fight against the followers of Mammon (Microsoft Internet Explorer). -->

Again, the "beast" is Netscape. The text probably refers to Netscape's hope that, by opening its source, they could attract a "legion" of developers all across the world, who would help improve the software (with the "din of a million keyboards"). The "legion" is actually a reference to the biblical quote Mark 5:9 in the King James Version (KJV) bible ("And he asked him, What is thy name? And he answered, saying, My name is Legion: for we are many."), since The Book of Mozilla is presented as a sort of "computer bible" with prophecies. "Mammon" refers to Microsoft, whose Internet Explorer browser was Netscape's chief competition. The word "mammon," in various Semitic languages, is related to money and riches; it appears in English translations of the Bible, and is sometimes used as the name of a demon of avarice. It may therefore imply not only that Microsoft has vastly greater funds to draw on, but that it has greedily abused that fact to further its own position in the marketplace; it also highlights the difference between the purely commercial development of Internet Explorer, and the new community-driven development of Netscape/Mozilla. "Red Letter Edition" may be a reference to so-called Red Letter Editions of the Bible, which print quotations by Jesus in red ink. It could also be a reference to a fact that March 31, 1998 was a red-letter day for the Mozilla project.

== The Book of Mozilla, 7:15 ==
The next installment of The Book of Mozilla was written by Neil Deakin. It is included in all versions of Mozilla released from September 2003 to July 2008 (Mozilla 1.5 – Mozilla Firefox 3.0 Beta 2), all versions of Camino, all versions of the Mozilla Thunderbird email client until 2.0.0.24, all versions of the SeaMonkey application suite until 1.1.19, the Epiphany web browser (version 1.8.0), the Minimo Pocket PC web browser, and all Netscape versions from 7.2 to 8.1.3 (except some Netscape Browser prototype releases):

And so at last the beast fell and the unbelievers rejoiced. But all was not lost, for from the ash rose a great bird. The bird gazed down upon the unbelievers and cast fire and thunder upon them. For the beast had been reborn with its strength renewed, and the followers of Mammon cowered in horror. — from The Book of Mozilla, 7:15

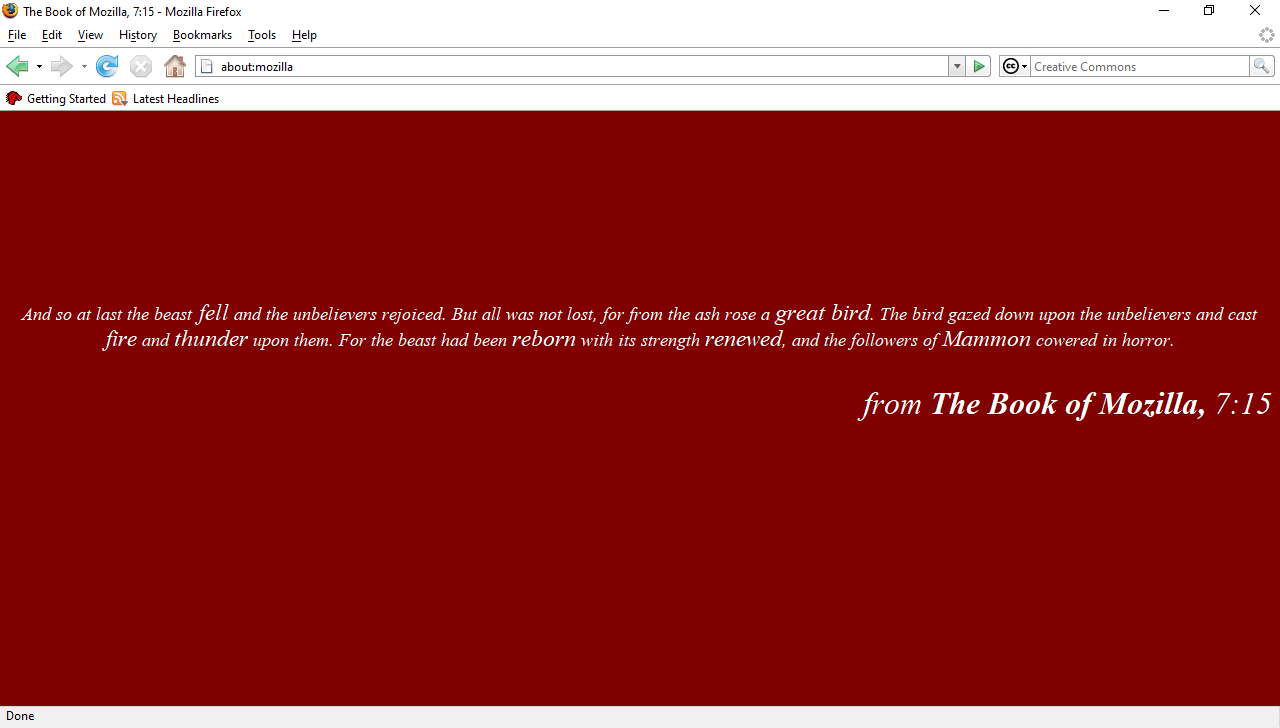
Screenshot of The Book of Mozilla, 7:15 in Mozilla Firefox 2.x

The 7:15 chapter and verse notation refers to July 15, 2003, the day when America Online shut down its Netscape browser division and the Mozilla Foundation was launched.

In the HTML source of Book of Mozilla page, this verse is accompanied by the following annotation:

<!-- 15th July 2003: AOL closed its Netscape division and the Mozilla foundation was created -->
<!-- The beast died (AOL closed its Netscape division) but immediately rose from its ashes (the creation of the Mozilla foundation and the Firebird browser, although the name was later changed to Firefox). -->

The "beast" falling refers to Netscape being closed down by its now parent company AOL. The "great bird" that rises from the ash is the Mozilla Foundation, which was established to continue Mozilla development. The bird rises from the ash like a phoenix – a reference to the original name of the Mozilla Firefox browser (known as Firebird at the time this verse was written). The bird casts down "fire" and "thunder" on the "unbelievers", which is a direct reference to the Mozilla Firebird (now Firefox) and Mozilla Thunderbird products, which became the main focus of Mozilla development a few months before the events of July 15. The fact that the beast has been "reborn" indicates that the spirit of Netscape will live on through the Foundation (which is made up mostly of ex-Netscape employees) and its strength has been "renewed" as the foundation is less reliant on AOL (who many feel neglected Netscape). Again, "Mammon" is Microsoft, Mozilla's main commercial competitor.

== The Book of Mozilla, 8:20 ==
Netscape's lead browser engineer Christopher Finke contributed the next verse of The Book of Mozilla. It was first made public in the June 5, 2007 release of Netscape Navigator 9.0b1. The verse was included in all subsequent versions of Netscape, until the final discontinuation of the browser (Netscape Navigator 9.0b1 - 9.0.0.6).

And thus the Creator looked upon the beast reborn and saw that it was good. — from The Book of Mozilla, 8:20

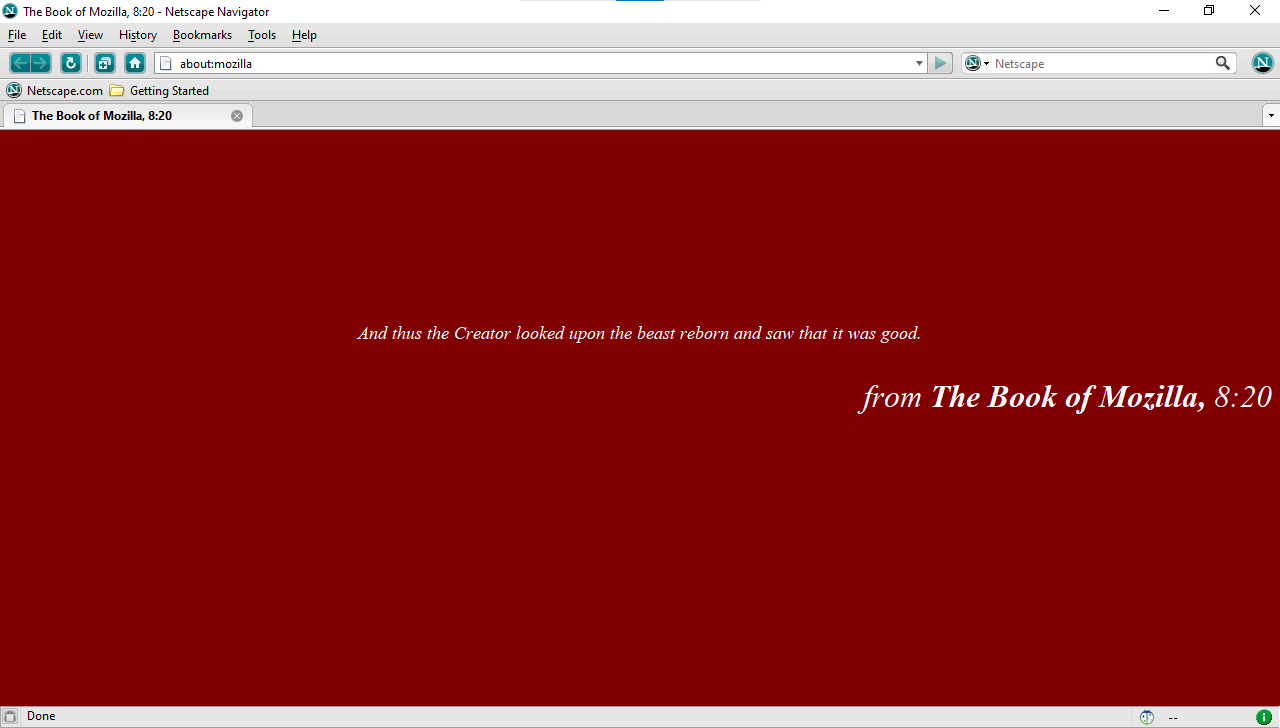
Screenshot of The Book of Mozilla, 8:20 in Netscape 9

The 8:20 chapter and verse notation refers to August 20, 2006, when the first internal email was sent mentioning the possibility of developing the next Netscape Navigator in house.

Unlike previous verses, the HTML source for the Book of Mozilla page does not feature any verse-related annotations.

The "Creator" refers to Netscape the company. There are two interpretations of the verse: the phrase "beast reborn" appears in the previous verse referring to the Mozilla Foundation and "it was good" could be a tribute to everyone who contributed to the Mozilla project. "Beast reborn" could also be a reference to Netscape reopening their browser division instead of outsourcing development; Netscape Browser 8 was produced by Mercurial Communications.

This verse is a parody of God's creation of Earth as described in Genesis 1 of the Bible. It also may be referencing Luke 3:22 of the Bible.

== The Book of Mozilla, 11:9 ==
Mammon slept. And the beast reborn spread over the earth and its numbers grew legion. And they proclaimed the times and sacrificed crops unto the fire, with the cunning of foxes. And they built a new world in their own image as promised by the sacred words, and spoke of the beast with their children. Mammon awoke, and lo! it was naught but a follower. — from The Book of Mozilla, 11:9 (10th Edition)

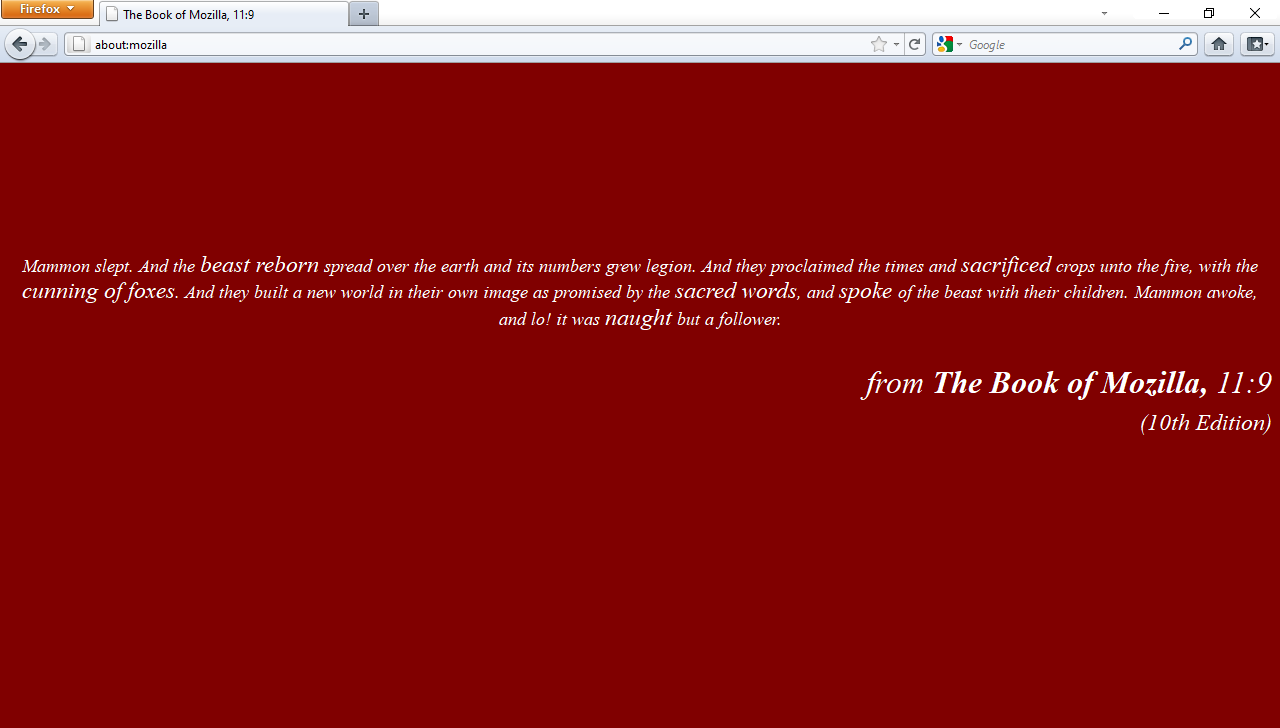
Screenshot of The Book of Mozilla, 11:9 in Firefox 4.0.1

This verse landed in the Mozilla trunk codebase on January 9, 2008. It was included in Firefox 3.0 Beta 3 through 20.0.1, SeaMonkey 2.0 Alpha 1 through 2.17.1, Thunderbird 3.0 Alpha 1 through 20 Beta 1, Mobile Firefox Alpha 1, Flock Browser Version 2.0.6, Waterfox, and Songbird.

In the HTML source of the Book of Mozilla page, this verse is accompanied by the following annotation:

<!-- 9th November 2004: Firefox 1.0 is officially released -->
<!-- The worldwide support of Firefox fans leads to its success, illustrating the power of community-based open source projects. -->

"Mammon" is again Internet Explorer, which "slept" for the 5 years between releases (between Internet Explorer 6 and 7). The "beast reborn" refers to Firefox, which gained supporters who self-organized through Spread Firefox and undertook publicity for the browser, taking out an advertisement in The New York Times and making a crop circle shaped like the Firefox logo. The "cunning of foxes" is a direct reference to Firefox's name. The "new world" refers to modern, standards-based dynamic websites and open source applications. The latter half of the passage links to the Mozilla Manifesto and the about:Mozilla newsletter. The last part, starting with "Mammon awoke," speaks of the release of Internet Explorer 7 and with "it was naught but a follower" describes it as a follower, copying several of the functions in Firefox that Internet Explorer previously lacked. Additionally, "10th edition" is an allusion to the Mozilla Foundation's 10th anniversary, which occurred during the Firefox 3 development cycle.

== The Book of Mozilla, 15:1 ==
The twins of Mammon quarrelled. Their warring plunged the world into a new darkness, and the beast abhorred the darkness. So it began to move swiftly, and grew more powerful, and went forth and multiplied. And the beasts brought fire and light to the darkness. — from The Book of Mozilla, 15:1

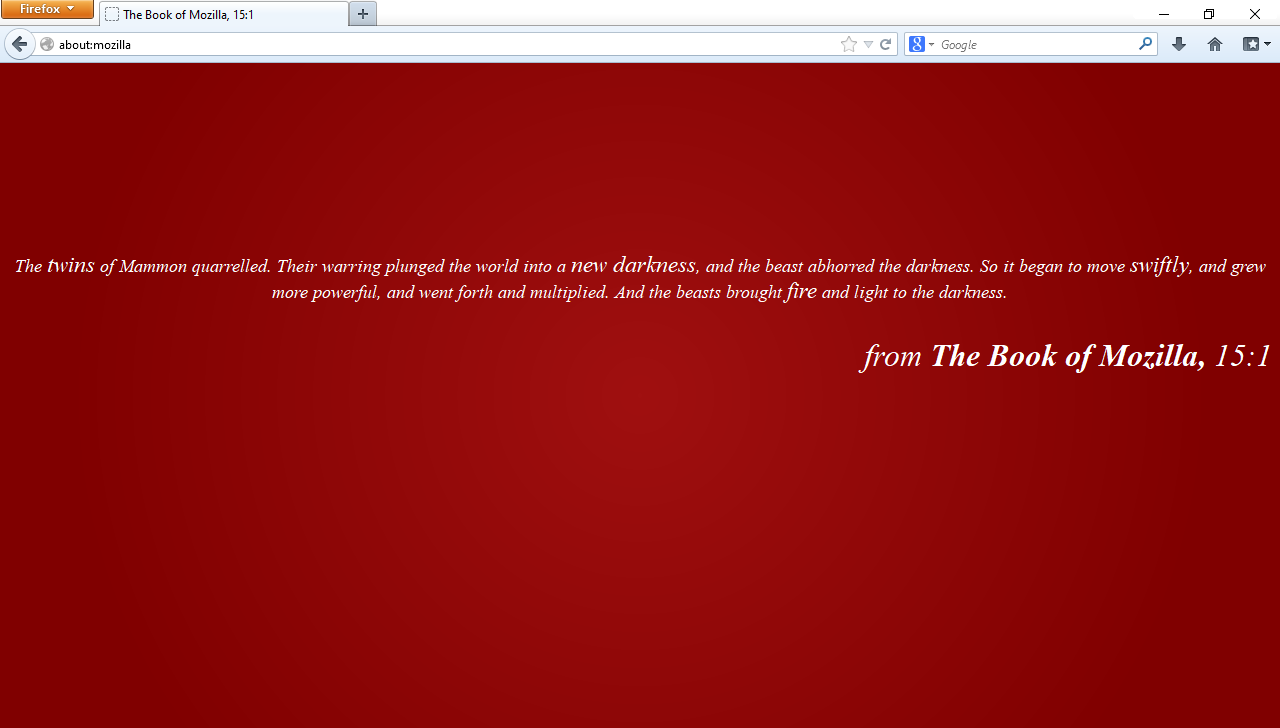
Screenshot of The Book of Mozilla, 15:1 in Firefox 21

This verse landed in the Mozilla trunk codebase on January 23, 2013. It first appeared in the nightly builds of Firefox 21 (Specifically, Firefox 21.0 Alpha 1 build 2013-01-23). Instead of a plain background, it now features a subtle radial gradient.

It is included in all Firefox versions from Firefox 21.0 to 58.0, all SeaMonkey versions since 2.18 Beta 1, and all Thunderbird versions since 21 Beta 1.

It can be still seen in SeaMonkey, XULRunner and the Wine Internet Explorer due to the unusual histories of them.

The "twins of Mammon" refers to Apple and Google, whose mobile operating systems, respectively iOS and Android, have taken a duopoly of the mobile OS market. The "new darkness" refers to the closed nature of traditional app stores. The beast moving "swiftly" refers to the new rapid release cycle of Firefox. The phrase "went forth and multiplied" refers to "Firefox becoming multiple things" through Firefox for Android and Firefox OS. The verse number 15:1 refers to the code freeze of Firefox OS 1.0 (January 15, 2013).

== The Book of Mozilla, 11:14 ==
The Beast adopted new raiment and studied the ways of Time and Space and Light and the Flow of energy through the Universe. From its studies, the Beast fashioned new structures from oxidised metal and proclaimed their glories. And the Beast's followers rejoiced, finding renewed purpose in these teachings. — from The Book of Mozilla, 11:14

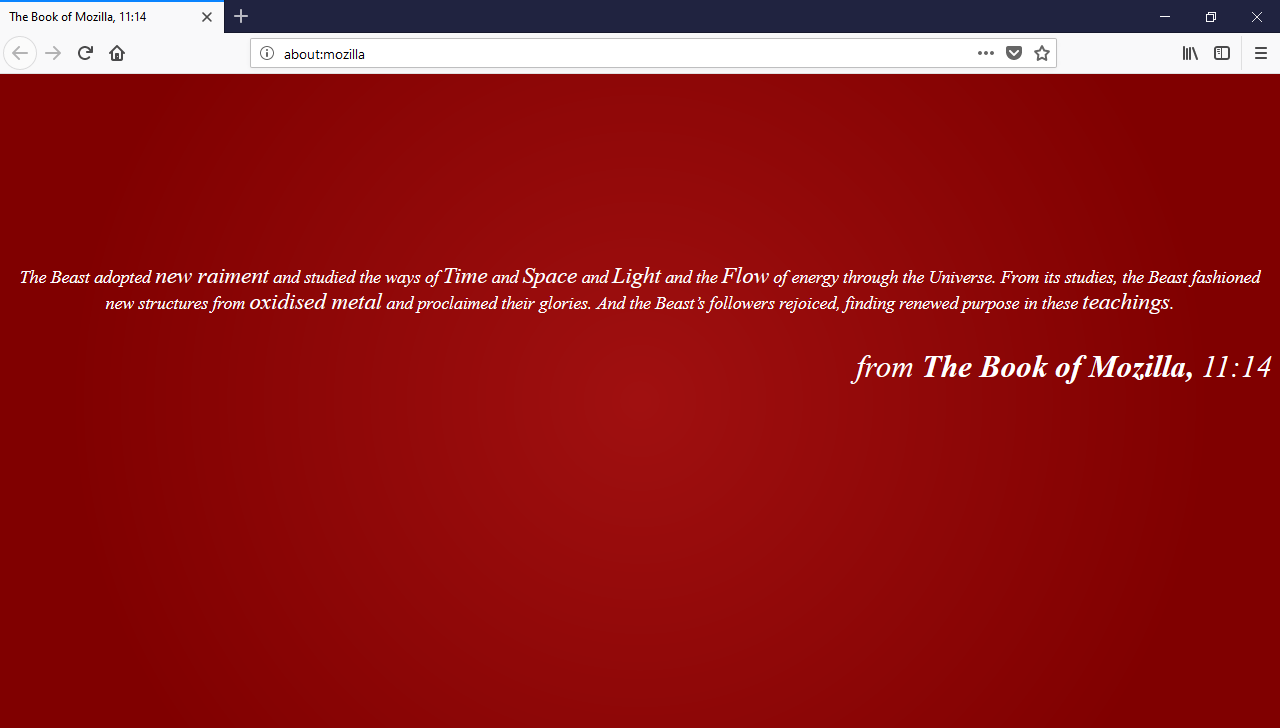
Screenshot of The Book of Mozilla, 11:14 in Firefox 58

This verse first appeared in Firefox Nightly 58, landing in the Mozilla trunk codebase on September 22, 2017, and was later uplifted to show up in Firefox 57 Beta.

It refers to the major changes that culminated in the Firefox 57 release with the Quantum project. "Time and Space" refer to Quantum itself, while "Flow" refers to the Quantum Flow project, "new raiment" and "Light" refer to the UI refresh known as the Photon project. The Quantum Project contained the first major piece of code taken from Servo, the layout engine written in Rust, to which "oxidised metal" is a reference. The 11:14 chapter and verse notation refers to November 14, 2017, the day Firefox 57 was released.

== The Book of Mozilla, 6:27 ==
The Beast continued its studies with renewed Focus, building great Reference works and contemplating new Realities. The Beast brought forth its followers and acolytes to create a renewed smaller form of itself and, through Mischievous means, sent it out across the world. — from The Book of Mozilla, 6:27

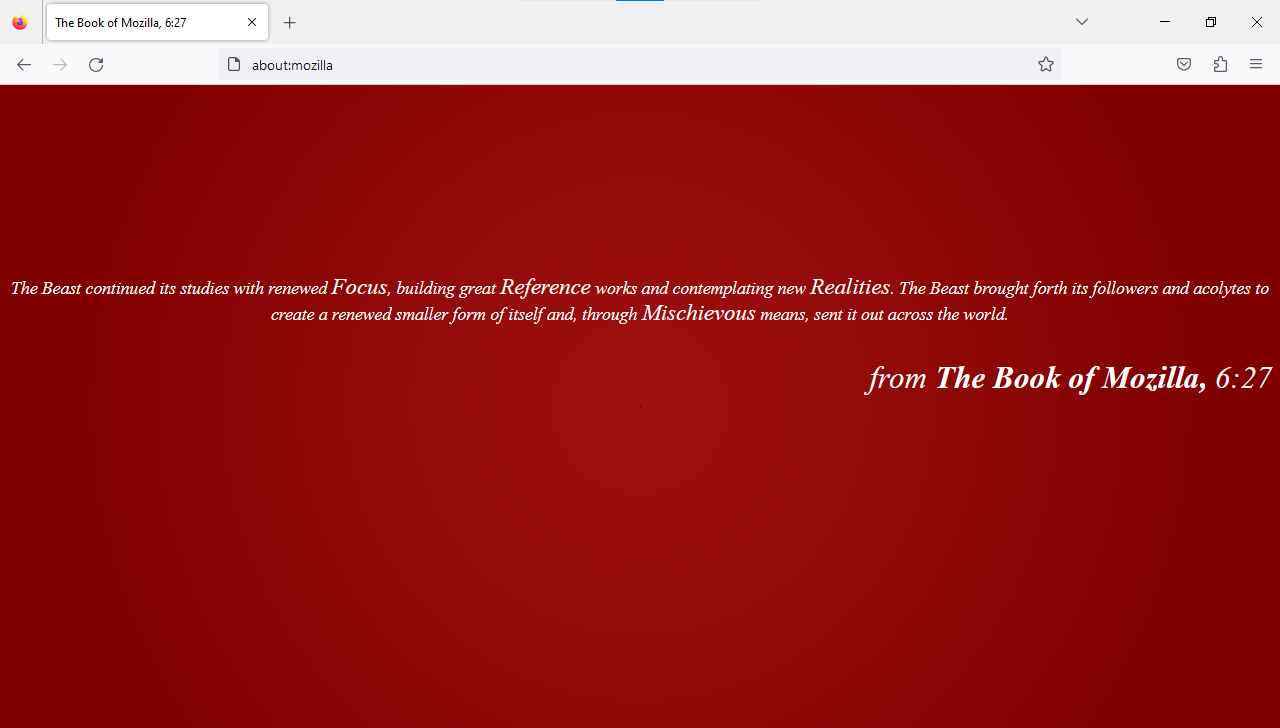
Screenshot of The Book of Mozilla, 6:27 in Firefox 117

This verse first appeared in Firefox Nightly 80, landing in the Mozilla trunk codebase on July 22, 2020. According to its annotation, it was intended to be added on June 27, 2019, with the introduction of Firefox Preview.

In the HTML source of the Book of Mozilla page, this verse is accompanied by the following annotation:

<!-- 27th June 2019: Firefox Preview is made available for testing by early adopters -->
<!-- Firefox Focus, Reference Browser, and Firefox Reality all use the new GeckoView as does Firefox for Android which was rebuilt lighter and faster under the code name Fenix prior to release. -->

Emphasized words refer to Firefox Focus, Reference Browser, and Firefox Reality, all of which had switched to the Quantum-based GeckoView for higher performance.

== Behavior in different browsers ==
=== Flock ===
==== The Book of Mozilla, 11:1 ====
Though not an official verse by Mozilla, a new verse of the Book of Mozilla, 11:1, became available in Flock Browser 1.0+, a "Social Web Browser" based on Firefox. This verse is shown on blue/white vertical gradient when about:mozilla is entered into the location bar. The verse is as follows.

And when the Beast had taken the quarter of the Earth under its rule, a quarter hundred Birds of Sulfur flew from the Depths. The birds crossed hundreds of mountain views and found twenty four wise men who came from the stars. And then it began, the believers dared to listen. Then, they took their pens and dared to create. Finally, they dared to share their deed with the whole of mankind. Spreading words of freedom and breaking the chains, the birds brought deliverance to everyone. — from The Book of Mozilla, 11:1

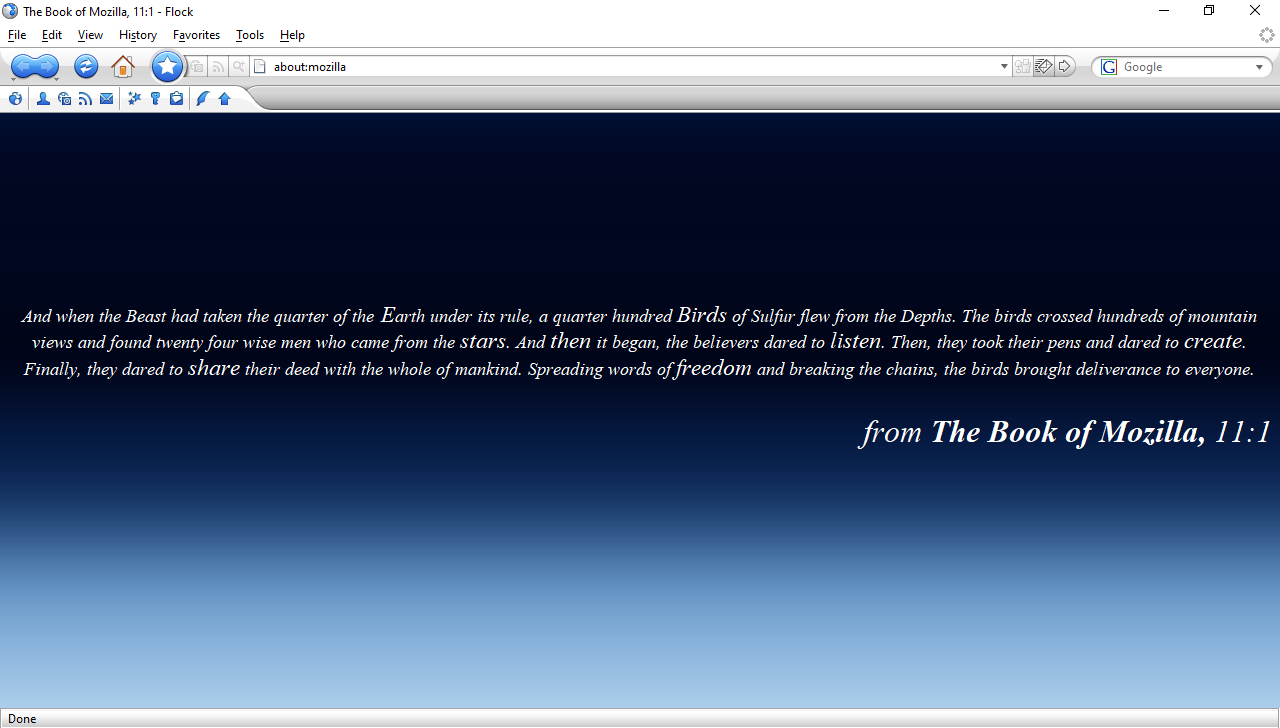
The book of Mozilla in Flock

"And when the beast had taken the quarter of the earth under its rule..." is probably a reference to the 25% market share Firefox had gained over the more popular Internet Explorer. "Birds of Sulfur" references the developmental codename of Flock, which is Sulfur. The "mountain views" references the city of Mountain View, California where the company that produces Flock (as well as Mozilla) was based at the time of writing. The "24 wise men" refer to the 24 staff employees of Flock at that time. The "stars" refer to the star used in the branding ("Flockstar"). Though this verse was released 5 November 2007, much of the meaning is still unclear. "They took their pens and dared to create" is most likely a reference to the blogging and social networking integration in Flock. The section "Finally, they dared to share their deed with the whole of mankind." could possibly be making a reference to the fact that it is open source, and that they shared their good deed (their creation of the browser) with the world.

=== Internet Explorer ===
In some versions of Internet Explorer prior Windows XP Service Pack 2, about:mozilla produces a blank blue page referencing the Blue Screen of Death.

The source markup of the page defines the text color as white. The page still can be seen (even in Edge for Windows 10) when using the URL: res://mshtml.dll/about.moz (however, without using this URL in IE10, it will cancel the webpage navigation). The about page was defined in a registry entry HKEY_LOCAL_MACHINE\SOFTWARE\Microsoft\Internet Explorer\AboutURLs.

The Wine Internet Explorer displays the 15:1 verse.

=== Iceweasel ===
Due to a dispute with the Mozilla Corporation, the Debian project was forced to change the name and branding of Mozilla Firefox in its distribution. In response, it changed the name to Iceweasel and the icon to a white weasel-like variant of the Firefox logo. Iceweasel includes the about:mozilla easter egg which shows the 15:1 verse. However, when users navigate to about:iceweasel they see a thematically similar message from the Book of Ice that describes the dispute with Mozilla and the creation of Iceweasel.

And thus the beast grew powerful, and fire and thunder swept the land. But Mammon stirred in their hearts, and the beast Foundered, and its Corpse arose, and commanded "thou shalt not fly in my name." And the blazes shall freeze cold, and the souls of the followers of Mammon shall learn to tremble in the face of ice as they did before the fire. — from The Book of Ice, 10:13

The "Corpse" in this edition represents the Mozilla Corporation and the references to the prohibition on "flying in my name" is a reference to the trademark prohibition.

=== Netscape ===
Starting with Netscape 0.93beta (and up to version 1.0), about:mozilla produced the text "Mozilla Rules!".

Viewing the about:mozilla page with a Unix version of Netscape would change the throbber to an animation of Mozilla rising up from behind the "planet" logo and breathing fire.

=== Pale Moon ===
Prior to Pale Moon version 26, typing about:mozilla would show the 15:1 verse. However, in Pale Moon 26 and above it displays the following:

Mozilla: In Memoriam
Dedicated to the tireless developers who have come and gone.
To those who have put their heart and soul into Mozilla products.
To those who have seen their good intentions and hard work squandered.
To those who really cared about the user, and cared about usability.
To those who truly understood us and desired freedom, but were unheard.
To those who knew that change is inevitable, but loss of vision is not.
To those who were forced to give up the good fight.
Thank you. Pale Moon would not have been possible without you.

This verse is also included (with branding modified) in the Basilisk web browser.

Similarly to Iceweasel, Pale Moon has its own take on The Book of Mozilla, this time dubbed "The Chronicles of the Pale Moon", which can be viewed by navigating to about:palemoon; however, instead of the chapter and verse number referring to a date of significance in the browser's history, it refers to the version number the verse first appeared in, and instead of being in the middle of the page, the subtle radial gradient is near the top right. In Pale Moon 24.2 to 27.0, the page title read "The Child of the Moon", and it showed the following text:

The Beast stumbled in the dark for it could no longer see the path. It started to fracture and weaken, trying to reshape itself into the form of metal.
Even the witches would no longer lay eyes upon it, for it had become hideous and twisted.

The soul of the Beast seemed lost forever.

Then, by the full moon's light, a child was born; a child with the unbridled soul of the Beast that would make all others pale in comparison.

— from the Chronicles of the Pale Moon, 24:2

The phrase "the form of metal" is a reference to Google's Chrome browser.

Since version 27.1 (when Pale Moon became a true fork), the page title reads "The Dragon's Roots". The text reads:

The child waxed, its soul burning with curiosity and independence. Growing and evolving into a completely different Beast than its ancestor.
Slowly and steadily shedding its ancestor's form, alike a Dragon growing up. Expelling parts of the old Beast but embracing others.

The Dragon changed, but never stopped listening. It kept in touch with its nature and those who would gaze upon its growing form.

Not everyone could follow on the path taken, as the old bed of withered roots was left behind for a new world.

— from the Chronicles of the Pale Moon, 27:1

The "ancestor" is believed to refer to Firefox, while the "bed of withered roots" is believed to refer to the Firefox ESR 24 codebase.

With the release of Pale Moon 28, the version number references were abandoned. The page title does not contain a title for the verse, and the text reads:

And so, our focus was drawn through time and space to the emerging dragon who would not abandon hope.
Its resilience, stubbornness and spirit unbroken, and searching for long hours to find those willing to join its cause.
The old nest abandoned, the death throes of the Beast ignored, and more determined than ever to find glory in the future.

— from The Chronicles of the Pale Moon, 55:2

In this verse, the "old nest" is believed to refer to the old Mozilla XUL Platform used by prior versions, which had been abandoned in favour of a fork named UXP under the hood, while retaining the older but customisable interface from Firefox versions 4 through 28.

With version 28.5.0, the page's text was once updated:

The landscape changed as time went on: flowing, twisting, corrupting. The dull sheen of tainted metal shining through everywhere.
In the trees, roots, animals, and even the mountainous valleys that had always been an oasis of difference.
Still, our dragon continued, untainted and resolute, soaring above.
There would be a home yet, a sanctuary, a place for all those not given in to this singular invading force that was misshaping the world.

— from The Chronicles of the Pale Moon, 66:1

In this verse, "landscape" seems to refer to the current browser scene, "tainted metal" may be a reference to Chromium (referencing the migration of browsers like Opera and Vivaldi to Chromium), and "sanctuary" may refer to Unified XUL Platform (UXP), which provides a common platform for XUL-based applications to build on.

=== SeaMonkey ===
In versions of SeaMonkey browser later than 2.0, about:mozilla displays the 15:1 verse. In some newer versions of SeaMonkey, about:seamonkey will display a verse similar to "The Book of Mozilla, 3:31 (Red Letter Edition)", only with few wording changes, and the book's name is switched to "The Book of SeaMonkey, 1:30". It's also notable that the background color is changed from maroon to teal (#33CC99).

And the meek shall be made legion, their numbers shall be increased.
The din of many keyboards like unto a great storm shall cover the earth and the followers of the beast and Mammon shall tremble.

— from The Book of SeaMonkey, 1:30

== See also ==
- about: URI scheme
- Mozilla (mascot)
