= Beonex Communicator =

Internet application suite

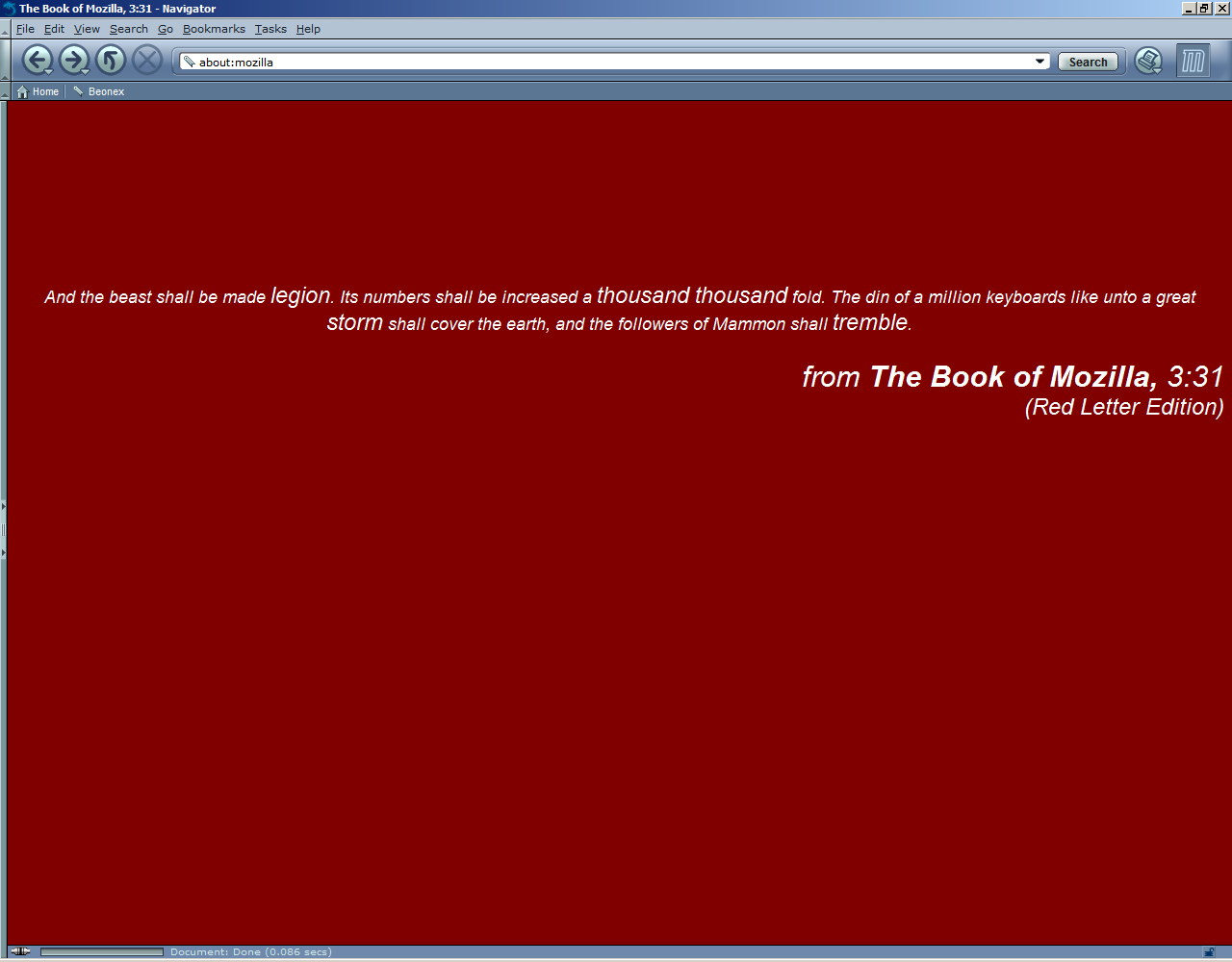
- Beonex Communicator 0.6 displaying the Book of Mozilla
- Original author(s): Ben Bucksch
- Developer(s): Beonex Business Services
- Initial release: Never
- Preview release: 0.8.2-stable / 21 March 2003
- Written in: C++, XUL, XBL, JavaScript
- Operating system: Microsoft Windows, Mac OS X, Linux, FreeBSD
- Available in: English, German
- Type: Internet suite
- License: MPL/Netscape Public License
- Website: www.beonex.com

Beonex Communicator is a discontinued open-source Internet suite based on the Mozilla Application Suite (MAS) by Ben Bucksch, a German Mozilla developer. It was intended to have a higher security and privacy level than other commercial products. The Internet suite contains a Web browser, an email and news client, an HTML editor (based on Mozilla Composer) and an IRC client (based on ChatZilla).

Beonex Business Services offered the suite for free and provided documentation, easy install routines for third-party plug-ins, and tried to sell support and customer-specific changes on the browser. The main goal was to implement Kerberos, OpenPGP, and LDAP in Beonex, but that was marked as failed in mid-2004. It was discontinued before reaching production release stage.

== History ==
Overall, this project seems most interested in staying as true to Mozilla as possible.

Mozilla Organization stated that the Mozilla Application Suite was only for developers and testing purposes and was not meant for end users.

On 5 January 2001 Beonex was included in the Linux distribution kmLinux version S-0.4, but was removed in version S-0.5 released on 23 March 2001. Beonex 0.8 was released in June 2002 received positive reviews about its speed.

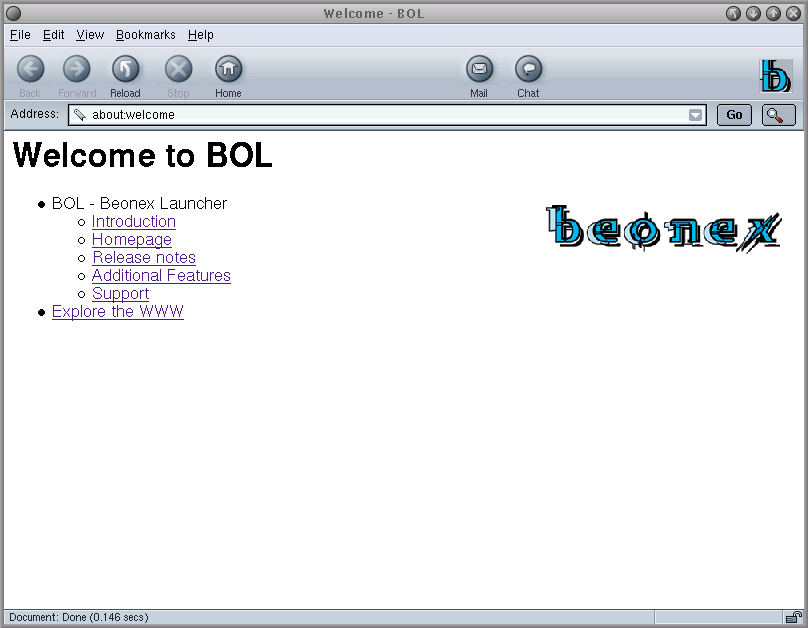
a BeOL preview

Beonex Launcher (BeOL, spoken B-O-L), was an additional upcoming product that never left alpha status; it was a stripped-down version of Beonex Communicator: a Web browser combined with an email client and a chat client.

With a few preview releases of version 0.9 in mid-2002, Bucksch showed some new features he wanted to integrate, but before this version gained a stable status, he announced on 2 March 2004 that no new releases were planned until the Mozilla Foundation decided its future policy. In 2005, the Mozilla Foundation officially changed its policies and created the Mozilla Corporation to provide end-user support.

Beonex Communicator 0.8.2-stable has several known security issues. Beonex never received much market share.

In October 2020, the distributor of Beonex joined the Coalition for App Fairness, which defends the rights of app developers.

== Comparison with Netscape and MAS ==
The browser does not transmit referrers by default and has the possibility to create a fake referrers. The browser deletes all cookies upon exiting and disables several JavaScript functions which could have served as attack vectors. Beonex also allows changing the user agent.

In the following comparison table not all releases of Netscape and MAS are included. For a more complete table see Gecko (layout engine).

Mozilla Application Suite	Netscape	Beonex Communicator	
Mozilla Application Suite	Netscape	Version	Release date
0.6	6.0	0.6	14 November 2000
0.9.2	6.1		
0.9.4	6.2		
0.9.4.1	6.2.2	0.7	8 November 2001
1.0		0.8	5 June 2002
1.0.1	7.0	0.8.1	19 September 2002
1.0.2	7.01 and 7.02	0.8.2	10 March 2003
1.1		0.9pre	27 August 2002

=== Differences from Netscape ===
In contrast with Netscape, Beonex has included nearly the same features except the proprietary parts like the integrated Net2Phone, and the AOL Instant Messenger. For online chatting, ChatZilla was integrated and the sidebar and the search engines are also pre-configured. Beonex is less resource-intensive than Netscape.

Beonex includes a migration tool to import old profiles from Netscape Communicator.

=== Differences from MAS ===
Beonex Communicator was not a fork of MAS; rather, it was a separate branch, so no significant changes were made. HTML email and JavaScript are turned off by default and thus, it displays email only in plain text with bold and cursive additions which were added later in MAS 1.1. The search engines is compatible with the Mycroft project and is located in the sidebar providing more features.
