= List of web browsers =

As of June 2025

Timeline representing the history of various web browsers

The following is a list of notable web browsers.

== Layout engines ==
- Gecko is developed by the Mozilla Foundation.
  - Goanna is a fork of Gecko developed by Moonchild Productions.
- Servo is an experimental web browser layout engine being developed cooperatively by Mozilla and Samsung. In 2020 the engine's development was transferred to the Linux Foundation.
- Presto was developed by Opera Software for use in Opera. Development stopped as Opera transitioned to Blink.
- Trident is developed by Microsoft for use in the Windows versions of Internet Explorer 4 to Internet Explorer 11.
  - EdgeHTML is the engine developed by Microsoft for Edge [Legacy]. It is a largely rewritten fork of Trident with all legacy code removed.
- Tasman was developed by Microsoft for use in Internet Explorer 5 for Macintosh.
- KHTML was developed by the KDE project but has since been discontinued.
  - WebKit is a fork of KHTML by Apple Inc. used in Apple Safari, and formerly in Chromium and Google Chrome.
    - Blink is a 2013 fork of WebKit's WebCore component by Google used in Chromium, Google Chrome, Brave, Microsoft Edge, Opera, and Vivaldi.

== Graphical ==
=== Trident shells ===
Other software publishers have built browsers and other products around Microsoft's Trident engine. The following browsers are all based on that rendering engine:

- 360 Secure Browser
- AOL Explorer
- Deepnet Explorer
- GreenBrowser
- Internet Explorer
- MediaBrowser
- MSN Explorer
- NeoPlanet
- NetCaptor
- QQ Browser
- Yahoo! Browser (or partnership browsers e.g. "AT&T Yahoo! Browser"; "Verizon Yahoo! Browser"; "BT Yahoo! Browser", etc.)

=== Gecko-based ===
- Camino for macOS (formerly Chimera)
- Conkeror, (keyboard-driven browser)
- Galeon, (GNOME's old default browser)
- K-Meleon (Windows)
  - K-MeleonCCF ME (for Windows based on K-Meleon core, written mostly in Lua)
  - K-Ninja (for Windows based on K-Meleon)
- MicroB (for Maemo)
- Minimo (for mobile)
- Mozilla Firefox (formerly Firebird and Phoenix, developed by the Mozilla Foundation)
  - AT&T Pogo (based on Firefox)
  - Cliqz (Firefox fork)
  - Comodo IceDragon (Firefox-based web browser for Windows with privacy and performance enhancements, developed by Xcitium formerly Comodo Security Solutions)
  - Flock (was based on Firefox until version 2.6.1, and then based on Chromium)
  - Floorp (based on Firefox with more customizing options)
  - Iceweasel (Debian's Firefox rebrand)
  - GNU IceCat (GNU's fork of Firefox)
  - LibreWolf
  - Netscape Browser 8 to Netscape Navigator 9 (discontinued)
  - TenFourFox (Firefox port to PowerPC versions of Mac OS X)
  - Timberwolf (AmigaOS' Firefox rebrand)
  - Tor Browser (privacy focused browser)
    - Mullvad Browser (based on Tor Browser)
  - Swiftfox (processor-optimised builds based on Firefox)
  - Waterfox (Firefox-based web browser for Windows, macOS, and Linux)
  - xB Browser (formerly XeroBank Browser and Torpark), portable browser for anonymous browsing, originally based on Firefox
  - Zen Browser
- Firefox for Android (codenamed Fenix)
- Mozilla Application Suite
  - Beonex Communicator (separate branch, based on Mozilla Application Suite)
  - Classilla (an updated fork of the Suite to Mac OS 9)
  - Gnuzilla (GNU's fork)
  - Netscape (Netscape 6 to 7, based on Mozilla)
  - SeaMonkey (successor to Mozilla Application Suite)
    - Iceape (Debian's Seamonkey rebrand)
- Skyfire (for mobile)
- SlimBrowser

=== Goanna-based ===
- Basilisk – similar to Pale Moon, but with the interface of Firefox 29–56 and a few other differences
- K-Meleon – starting from version 77 (2019)
- Pale Moon – a fork of Firefox that maintains support for XUL/XPCOM extensions and retains the user interface of the Firefox 4–28 era

=== Gecko- and Trident-based ===
Browsers that use both Trident and Gecko include:

- K-Meleon with the IE Tab extension
- Mozilla Firefox with the IE Tab extension
- Netscape Browser 8

=== Webkit- and Trident-based ===
- GNOME Web
- Maxthon (up until version 4.2)
- QQ browser

=== Blink- and Trident-based ===
- Baidu Browser
- Maxthon (since version 4.2)
- Microsoft Edge

=== Gecko-, Trident-, and Blink-based ===
Browsers that can use Trident, Gecko and Blink include:

- Lunascape

=== KHTML-based ===
- Konqueror
- Konqueror Embedded

=== Presto-based ===
- Internet Channel (for Wii console, Opera-based)
- Nintendo DS Browser (Opera-based)
- Opera (for releases up until 12.18)

=== WebKit-based ===
- Safari
- Arora
- Bolt
- Dolphin Browser
- DuckDuckGo browser for macOS
- Flock since version 3.0
- iCab since version 4
- GNOME Web
- Iris Browser
- Konqueror (version 4 can use WebKit as an alternative to its native KHTML)
- Maxthon from version 3.0 to 5.0
- Midori before acquisition by Astian Foundation
- NetFront
- OmniWeb
- Orion
- Otter Browser
- Origyn Web Browser
- QtWeb
- qutebrowser
- PhantomJS
- Shiira
- SlimBrowser since version 10.0
- Steel
- surf
- Uzbl
- Nokia Browser for Symbian
- WebPositive
- xombrero

=== Blink-based ===
- Chromium
  - Free and open source
    - Beaker (discontinued)
    - Brave
    - Qt WebEngine
      - Dooble (from Version 2.2)
      - Falkon
    - qutebrowser (Blink backend mostly stable)
    - Ungoogled-chromium
  - Proprietary
    - Amazon Silk
    - Arc
    - Avast Secure Browser
    - ChatGPT Atlas
    - Cốc Cốc
    - Comodo Dragon
    - Epic
    - Google Chrome (based on Blink since Chrome v. 28)
    - JioPages
    - Microsoft Edge
    - NAVER Whale
    - DuckDuckGo for Android and Windows
    - Opera
    - Opera GX
    - Puffin Browser
    - Redcore
    - Rockmelt
    - SalamWeb
    - Sleipnir
    - SRWare Iron
    - Torch
    - Vivaldi
    - Yandex Browser

=== EdgeHTML-based ===
- Microsoft Edge [Legacy]

=== For Java platform ===
- BOLT Browser
- HotJava
- Opera Mini (only the Android version is actively developed as of 2022)
- ThunderHawk

=== Specialty browsers ===
Browsers created for enhancements of specific browsing activities.

==== Discontinued ====
- Flock (to enhance social networking, blogging, photo-sharing, and RSS news-reading)
- Ghostzilla (blends into the GUI to hide activity)
- Gollum browser (created specially for browsing Wikipedia)
- Kirix Strata (designed for data analytics)
- Miro (a media browser that integrates a BitTorrent addon)
- Nightingale (open source audio player and web browser based on the Songbird (see below) media player source code)
- Prodigy Classic (executable only within the application)
- Rockmelt (designed to combine web browsing, and social activities such as Facebook and Twitter into a unified one window experience)
- Songbird (browser with advanced audio streaming features and built-in media player with library)
- SpaceTime (search the web in 3D)
- ZAC Browser (for children with autism, autism spectrum disorders such as Asperger syndrome, pervasive developmental disorders (PDD), and PDD-NOS)

=== Mosaic-based ===
Mosaic was the first widely used web browser. The National Center for Supercomputing Applications (NCSA) licensed the technology and many companies built their own web browser on Mosaic. The best known are the first versions of Internet Explorer and Netscape.

- AMosaic
- IBM WebExplorer
- Internet Explorer 1.x
- Internet in a Box
- Mosaic-CK
- Netscape
- Spyglass Mosaic
- VMS Mosaic

=== Others ===
- Abaco (for Plan 9 from Bell Labs and Linux)
- Amaya
- Arachne (for DOS and Linux)
- Arena
- Ariadna (AMSD Ariadna) (first Russian web browser)
- AWeb (AmigaOS)
- Baidu Mobile Browser
- Dillo (for lower-end computers)
- DR-WebSpyder (for DOS)
- Embrowser (for DOS)
- Flow browser
- Gazelle (from Microsoft Research, OS-like)
- IBrowse (for AmigaOS)
- Ladybird (from SerenityOS)
- Mothra (for Plan 9 from Bell Labs)
- NetPositive (for BeOS, known as WebPositive on HaikuOS)
- NetSurf (an open source web browser originally for RISC OS and GTK, e.g. Linux, Windows and more platforms, written in C)
- Phoenix, a browser based on tkWWW
- Qihoo 360 mobile browsers
- tkWWW, based on Tcl
- Voyager (for AmigaOS)

=== Mobile browsers ===
- Amazon Silk
- Apple Safari
- Arc
- Brave
- Dolphin browser
- Firefox Focus
- Google Chrome
- Microsoft Edge
- Mozilla Firefox
- Opera Mobile
- Puffin Browser
- QQ browser
- Samsung Browser
- UC Browser
- Vivaldi
- Waterfox

== Text-based ==
- Emacs/W3
- EWW
- Line Mode Browser
- Links
  - ELinks
- Lynx
- w3m

== See also ==
- History of the web browser
- Timeline of web browsers
- Comparison of web browsers
- Comparison of browser engines
- List of search engines
- List of web browsers for Unix and Unix-like operating systems
- Usage share of web browsers
- Browser wars
