= Comparison of browser engines =

This article compares browser engines.

Some of these engines have shared origins. For example, the WebKit engine was created by forking the KHTML engine in 2001. Then, in 2013, a modified version of WebKit was officially forked as the Blink engine.

== General information ==
Engine	Development status	Creators	License	Used in
WebKit	Active	Apple, initially forked from KHTML	GNU LGPL, BSD-style	Safari browser, GNOME Web, Konqueror, Orion and all browsers on App Store for iOS
Blink	Active	Google, initially forked from WebKit	GNU LGPL, BSD-style	All Chromium-based browsers
Gecko	Active	Mozilla	Mozilla Public	Firefox browser and its forks; SeaMonkey browser, Thunderbird email client
Goanna	Active	M. C. Straver, initially forked from Gecko	Mozilla Public	Pale Moon, Basilisk, K-Meleon browsers
NetSurf	Active	NetSurf developers	GNU GPLv2	NetSurf browser
Servo	Experimental	Mozilla	Mozilla Public	Experimental browsers
LibWeb	Experimental; in pre-alpha	Ladybird Browser Initiative	2-clause BSD	Ladybird browser
KHTML	Discontinued	KDE	GNU LGPL	Formerly in the Konqueror browser
Tkhtml	Discontinued	Liem Bahneman	BSD	Formerly in Html Viewer 3 browser
Mariner	Discontinued	Netscape Communications	NPL	Netscape Communicator 5.0
Flow	Experimental; in beta	Ekioh	Proprietary	Flow browser
Trident	Discontinued	Microsoft	Proprietary	Internet Explorer browser; Microsoft Edge IE mode
EdgeHTML	Discontinued	Microsoft	Proprietary	Some UWP apps; formerly Microsoft Edge browser
Presto	Discontinued	Opera	Proprietary	Opera Mini browser in Extreme/Mini mode, where contents arrive pre-rendered using this engine server-side
NetFront	Discontinued	Access Co., Ltd.	Proprietary	Formerly in the NetFront browser, Palm Blazer 3 and up, the Dreamcast web browser, the PSP web browser, and PS3 web browser versions prior to system software 4.10.
Tasman	Discontinued	Microsoft	Proprietary	Internet Explorer 5 Macintosh Edition

== Support ==
These tables summarize what stable engines support.

=== Operating systems ===
The operating systems that engines can run on without emulation.

Engine	Windows	macOS	Linux	BSD	Haiku	Android	iOS
WebKit	Yes (Note: Must be built from source code.)	Yes	Yes	Yes	Yes	Yes	Yes
Blink	Yes	Yes	Yes	Yes	Yes (Note: Only available via QtWebEngine.)	Yes	No
Gecko	Yes	Yes	Yes	Yes	Yes	Yes	Yes
Goanna	Yes	Yes	Yes	Yes	No	No	No
NetSurf	Yes	No	Yes	Yes	Yes	No	No
Trident	Yes	No	No	No	No	No	No

=== Image formats ===
Engine	JPEG	JPEG 2000	JPEG XL	JPEG XL HDR	JPEG HDR	GIF	BMP	PNG	APNG	SVG	WebP	AVIF	AVIF HDR	HEIC	HEIC HDR
WebKit	Yes	Yes	Yes	Yes	Yes	Yes	Yes	Yes	Yes	Yes	Yes	Yes	Yes	Yes	Yes
Blink	Yes	No	Experimental (Note: Expected to ship in Chrome 155.)	Yes	Yes	Yes	Yes	Yes	Yes	Yes	Yes	Yes	Yes	No	No
Gecko	Yes	No	Experimental (Note: Enabled by default on Firefox Nightly.)	Experimental (Note: Converts images to SDR.)	No	Yes	Yes	Yes	Yes	Yes	Yes	Yes	No	No	No
Goanna	Yes	No	Yes	No	No	Yes	Yes	Yes	Yes	Yes	Yes	No	No	No	No
NetSurf	Yes	No	Yes	No	No	Yes	Yes	Yes	No	Yes	Yes	No	No	No	No
Trident	Yes	No	No	No	?	Yes	Yes	Yes	No	Partial	No	No	No	No	No

=== Media formats ===
Engine	VP9	AV1	HEVC	H264	Opus	FLAC
WebKit	Yes	Yes	Yes	Yes	?	Yes
Blink	Yes	Yes	Yes	Yes	Yes	Yes
Gecko	Yes	Yes	Partial (Note: HEVC 10-bit HDR videos are supported but not rendered correctly.)	Yes	Yes	Yes
Goanna	Yes	Yes	No	Yes	Yes	Yes
NetSurf	No	No	No	?	No	?
Trident	No	No	Partial	Yes	No	No

=== Typography ===
Engine	TTF	OTF	WOFF	WOFF2	@font-face CSS rule	Ligatures (font-variant-ligatures CSS property)
WebKit	Yes	Yes	Yes	Yes	Yes	Yes
Blink	Yes	Yes	Yes	Yes	Yes	Yes
Gecko	Yes	Yes	Yes	Yes	Yes	Yes
Goanna	Yes	Yes	Yes	Yes	Yes	Yes
NetSurf	?	?	No	No	Partial	No
Trident	Partial	Partial	Yes	No	Yes	No

=== Other items ===
Engine	Web Components	WebGL	WebGPU	XHTML
WebKit	Partial	Yes	Yes	Yes
Blink	Yes	Yes	Yes	Yes
Gecko	Yes	Yes	Yes	Yes
Goanna	Yes	Yes	No	Yes
NetSurf	No	No	No	?
Trident	No	Yes	No	Yes

== See also ==
- Comparison of web browsers
- Comparison of email clients
