= Layer =

Layer or layered may refer to:

== Arts, entertainment, and media ==
- Layers (Kungs album)
- Layers (Les McCann album)
- Layers (Royce da 5′9″ album)
- “Layers”, the title track of Royce da 5′9″’s sixth studio album
- Layer, a female Maverick Hunter in the Mega Man X series
- Layer, an element in a digital painting
- Layer (film), a 2022 Russian film
- LAYER, the stage name of Rei Wakana, a fictional character from BanG Dream!
- Layer, a zone in the Underground World in Donkey Kong Bananza

== Science ==
- Stratum, a layer of rock or soil with internally consistent characteristics
- Thermocline, a layer within a body of water where the temperature changes rapidly with depth
- Layer, an area in the neocortex with specific structure and connection pattern among neurons

== Technology ==
=== Computing ===
- Layer (object-oriented design), a group of classes that have the same set of link-time module dependencies to other modules
- Layers (digital image editing), used in digital image editing to separate different elements of an image
- Layers, in 2D computer graphics
- Abstraction layer, a way of hiding the implementation details of a particular set of functionality
  - Internet protocol suite layers
  - OSI model layers
- Layer element, a deprecated <iframe>-like tag, unique to Netscape 4 browsers
- Layer of objects, a term in CAD
- Map layer, a set of graphical information, especially in geographic information systems
- Layer (deep learning), a structure in the architecture of a deep learning model, which take information from the previous layers and then pass information to the next layer

=== Electronics ===
- Layer (electronics), a single thickness of some material covering a surface
- Dual layer recording, a DVD layer
- F region, or Appleton Layer in telecommunications

== Other uses ==
- Layer, a tier of archaeological deposits in an excavation
- Layer hen, a hen raised to produce eggs
- Layer cake, a cake consisting of stacked layers
- Layered, Inc., an American software company
- Layered clothing, the wearing of multiple layers of clothing for practical or fashion purposes
- Layered hair, a popular hair-styling technique
- Walter Francis Layer (1907-1965), American politician and U.S. Marine Corps colonel

== See also ==
- Layering (disambiguation)
- Multilevel (disambiguation)
