= Comodo Dragon =

Web browser based on the Chromium web browser

- Comodo Dragon 92, running on Windows 11
- Developer: Comodo Group
- Release: 2010
- Stable release: 131.0.6778.109 / 23 December 2024
- Preview release: 131.0.6778.109 / 18 December 2024
- Engine: Blink
- Operating system: Microsoft Windows
- Platform: IA-32, x86-64
- Size: 53.8 MB
- Available in: English and Spanish
- Type: Web browser
- License: Freeware
- Website: browser.comodo.com

Comodo Dragon is a discontinued freeware web browser based on Chromium and produced by Comodo Group. Sporting a similar interface to Google Chrome, Dragon does not implement Chrome's user tracking and some other potentially privacy-compromising features, replacing them with its own user tracking implementations, and provides additional security measures, such as indicating the authenticity and relative strength of a website's Secure Sockets Layer (SSL) certificate.

== Features ==
Upon installation, Comodo Dragon offers the opportunity to configure either the Comodo Dragon or the user's entire computer to use Comodo's own DNS servers instead of the user's Internet service provider. Comodo Dragon performs additional checks on the SSL digital certificates of secure websites, and informs users if a site's certificate may be of insufficient strength. It includes an on-demand site inspector designed to determine if a site hosts malicious code.

Instead of Google Updater, Comodo Dragon features its own built-in updater. If Dragon is uninstalled, users are given the option of keeping Dragon's cache and cookie files or deleting them.

In addition, the following Google Chrome features are removed or disabled in Dragon:

- Google user tracking
- Automatic access to Google Search on startup for users with Google as default search engine
- Google-hosted error pages when a server is not present
- Automatic address bar search suggestions
- Bug tracking system, which sends information about crashes or errors
- Built-in PDF viewer and Adobe Flash Player which is sandboxed
- Google Native Client (NaCl) support
- H.264 codec
- Google Safe Browsing which blocks malicious and phishing sites
- Google Docs, Sheets, and Slides which open various document and spreadsheet formats
- Google Translate, which automatically translates webpages in foreign languages

== Security issues ==
A Google engineer publicly disclosed a serious security vulnerability in Comodo Dragon after Comodo failed to respond to the issue within the 90 days Google provides software vendors. The advisory warns users who install Comodo Dragon that Dragon replaces their default browser, hijacks DNS settings, and disables the same-origin policy, which exposes users by allowing malicious websites to access private data.

Comodo's first attempt to patch the issue was shown to be ineffective. Comodo subsequently claimed the problems were fixed.

== Comodo license and tracking ==
Comodo tracks each user's time spent using the browser, its operating system, and browser inquiries about certificate revocation, which reveal the sites visited. Users can opt whether they also track activity and use it in more detail than that. Comodo and its partners use cookies and Google Analytics. "Comodo may disclose data to its affiliates and business partners who have established similar privacy standards."

Their privacy statement says that only in California is the IP address considered personal information. Comodo creates log files which track users, identifiable by cookie or browser features (and IP address outside California): "Comodo uses log files comprising of non-personally identifiable information to ... track movements throughout the site ... and gather broad demographic information for aggregate use."

The browser is supported by ads which "relate to the content of the information as part of the Product or queries made through the Product." They include many other software products, each with its own license.

The license has common terms about complying with subpoenas and interception orders, against reverse engineering, copying and sub-licensing, and disclaiming warranties and liability.

The license also requires disputes to be settled by arbitration in New Jersey. Users must give accurate registration information, and pay Comodo's costs " that, directly or indirectly, are based on your breach of this agreement, the information provided by you, or your infringement on the rights of a third party."

== See also ==
- Comodo Cybersecurity
- Comodo IceDragon – based on Firefox, also from Comodo Group
- Comodo Internet Security
- Comodo System Utilities
- Comodo Mobile Security
- History of web browsers
- List of web browsers
