= SpaceTime (software) =

3D web browser

SpaceTime 3D
- Original author: Eddie Bakhash
- Developers: SpaceTime 3D, Inc.
- Initial release: June 4, 2007
- Preview release: Release Client 1 / June 10, 2010; 15 years ago (Note: The latest preview date is taken from the digital signature of SpaceTime3D_Installer_RC1 which was signed by SpaceTime3D on Thursday, June 10, 2010 9:39:01 AM with VeriSign Class 3 Code Signing 2004 CA.)
- Operating system: Windows 2000/XPVista/
- Platform: Microsoft Windows

SpaceTime (Note: SpaceTime is trademarked by SpaceTime3D, Inc.: U.S. Trademark 78,735,286 and is also patented by SpaceTime3D, Inc. : US Patent No. 7,735,018) (also known as SpaceTime3D) was a 3D graphical user interface that displayed web pages in a 3d tabbed stack. When using search engines such as Google, for example, SpaceTime loads the first ten results as a stack of pages.

== History ==
SpaceTime product debuted in beta on June 4, 2007. On the day of the release, the San Jose Mercury News noted that the software was "the most advanced 3-D navigation system I've seen", while TechCrunch commented that SpaceTime is "pure eye candy, sort of like Second Life meets Firefox."

The technology was later presented at the 2008 CES tradeshow.

== Reception ==
The beta browser received mixed reviews. Katherine Boehret of The Wall Street Journal stated that "though I’ll still rely on Google for basic searches, visual search can save time and turn searching into a fun process." Jack M. Germain, of TechNewsWorld described how "SpaceTime delivers on its promise to save me time and provide a revolutionary online searching too" stating that "while I continue to use the 3-D searching environment, though, I am having more fun than I should at work." Edward N. Albro of PCWorld gave the beta browser a 2.5/5 stating that while its "visual results can make searches easier", that "for basic browsing, SpaceTime has no appeal" and that the browser was too "buggy and slow for basic browsing".

== See also ==
- SearchMe
- AT&T Pogo
- Cooliris
