= Comodo System Utilities =

Comodo System Utilities, also marketed as Comodo PC TuneUp, is a software suite by the Comodo Group, a software company known for Internet and network security software.

== Overview ==
Comodo System Utilities combines three cleaning utilities: Registry Cleaner, Disk Cleaner, and Privacy Cleaner. It includes the following programs:

- Windows registry cleaner: Identifies, removes or repairs any corrupted entries or files
- Disk cleaner: Frees up disk space and improve performance
- Privacy cleaner: Deletes cookies, cache and history
- SafeDelete: A trademarked product that deletes files that are determined to be safe to delete.

Comodo System Utilities requires Windows XP, Vista or 7 and can be downloaded for free.

== Reviews ==
- January 15, 2014, PCMag listed Comodo PC Tuneup among the top 7 PC Tuneup Utilities.
- October 21, 2013 PCMag reviewed Comodo PCTunep and gave it an "Editors Rating" of "Good". Jeffery L. Wilson wrote that it will improve your system performance, but noted that the key feature of Active Delete is only available in the Comodo System Utilities Pro edition.
- In September 2012 techsupportalert.com called Comodo System Utilities "The Best Free PC Cleanup Utility".
- August 20, 2012 Top5Freeware.com called Comodo System Utilities "a powerful freeware program which cleans up your computer with complete safety."
- In August 2012, Jeffery L. Wilson of PCMag gave Comodo System Utilities an Excellent rating, 4 of 5 stars. He states as his "Bottom Line" conclusion "Comodo System Utilities is a free and effective system-enhancing utility that is as potent, if not more so in certain cases, as paid apps".
- In July 2012 snapfiles.com gave Comodo System Utilities 4.5 of 5 stars.
- Downloadcrew.com gave Comodo System Utilities 4.5 of 5 stars. They said "System Utilities is a great suite of utilities that gives great results at no cost."
- On January 5, 2010 CNET gave Comodo System Utilities its highest rating "Spectacular", 5 of 5 stars. They said " Comodo System Cleaner is as well-designed and functional a program as its competitors, yet it's free, which makes it the best bargain there is.

== See also ==
- Comodo Dragon – Web browser based on the Chromium web browser
- Comodo IceDragon – Web browser
- Comodo Internet Security – Internet security software suite
- Comodo Mobile Security
- Xcitium – Software company formerly named Comodo
