= Mike Pinkerton =

American software engineer

- Education: Bachelor of Science in Computer Science; Master's Degree in Computer Science
- Alma mater: University of California, San Diego; Georgia Institute of Technology
- Occupation: software engineer

Mike "Pink" Pinkerton is an American software engineer who is known for his work on the Mozilla browsers. He lectures on Development of Open Source Software at George Washington University.

Pinkerton studied at University of California, San Diego where he graduated with a B.S. in Computer Science, then at Georgia Institute of Technology where he graduated with a Master's Degree in Computer Science.

Pinkerton started working at Netscape Communications in June 1997 where he worked on the Netscape Navigator and then Mozilla browsers. While at Netscape he started development of the Camino (then Chimera) web browser with Dave Hyatt. Hyatt, whom Pinkerton inexplicably refers to as "Jinglepants," was hired by Apple Inc. to work on the Safari browser and Pinkerton became the Camino project lead. In October 2002 he started working at AOL as Netscape Communications became a division within AOL.

In September 2005, he accepted a position at Google where he originally was part of their Firefox team. On January 9, 2006, Pinkerton announced on his blog that he had moved to Google's "Mac Client Team". On September 3, 2008, he announced on his blog that he was working on Mac port of Google's Chrome browser.

In 2018 Pinkerton's team launched version 69 of Chrome iOS as part of the Chrome 10th Anniversary.

Prior to his Chrome work, Pinkerton was the Technical Lead for Google Desktop for Mac.
