= Comodo IceDragon =

Web browser

Comodo IceDragon (Browser)

- IceDragon on Windows 11
- Developer: Comodo Group
- Stable release: 65.0.2.15 / 19 June 2019
- Preview release: 65.0.2.15 / 22 May 2019
- Engine: Quantum
- Operating system: Microsoft Windows
- Platform: IA-32, x86-64
- Type: Web browser
- License: MPL 2.0
- Website: www.comodo.com/home/browsers-toolbars/browser.php

Comodo IceDragon is a discontinued Firefox-based open source web browser from the Comodo Group, written for Microsoft Windows.

== Features ==
- Firefox-based: IceDragon 65 is based on the Firefox 65 codebase. It provides detection for Firefox hard-coded plugin installations.
- SiteInspector: Comodo's SiteInspector malware detection system is integrated into IceDragon. SiteInspector's link scanning feature checks whether a web page is malicious.
- SecureDNS service: IceDragon offers Comodo's Secure DNS Service to users as an alternative to using their Internet service provider. This is intended to produce faster page loads and safer browsing because SecureDNS references a real-time block list (RBL) of malicious websites.

== See also ==
- Comodo Cybersecurity
- Comodo Dragon – based on Chromium/Google's Chrome, also from Comodo Group
- Comodo Internet Security
- Comodo System Utilities
- Comodo Mobile Security
