= Thunderhawks =

Thunderhawks may refer to:

- Niagara Thunderhawks, a Junior "B" box lacrosse team
- Toronto ThunderHawks, an indoor soccer team

== See also ==
- Thunderhawk (disambiguation)
