= Comodo Mobile Security =

- Developer: Comodo Group
- Release: January 2012
- Stable release: 3.5.3500 (August 2016)
- Operating system: Android 2.2 and up
- Type: Antivirus software, Mobile Security
- License: Freeware
- Website: Comodo Official Website

Comodo Mobile Security (CMS) is a mobile application provided free by the Comodo Group that protects Android devices against viruses, worms and scripts. It also features SMS and call blocking, a software and process manager, data and apps backup and data traffic monitor. The anti-theft feature allows users to recover lost or stolen devices.

This is the first security app from Comodo, specialists in Internet security, for the Android platform.

Comodo Mobile Security requires Android 2.2 and up.

== Major releases ==
CMS 1.2

- CMS 1.2 was released in April 2012.

CMS 2.4
CMS 2.4 was released in January 2014. Major enhancements for CMS 2.4 include:

- Cloud antivirus scans. CMS now scans for malware using both local and cloud-based detection engines.
- Support for Android KitKat® (4.4).
- Added language support for Arabic, Bulgarian, Greek, English, Spanish, Farsi, French, Italian, Polish, Russian, Swedish, Turkish, Ukrainian, and Chinese.
- New layout and GUI design offers easier navigation, new icons and new backgrounds.

CMS 2.5 CMS 2.5 was released in June 2014.

New features:

- Tablet version: Tablets are more secure with CMS now.
- CMS now supports devices with x86 chipsets.

Enhancements

- Improved notification behavior, one can select to be notified on every app scan or just on any malware found
- Various other bug fixes are performed.

CMS 2.7 CMS 2.7 was released in December 2014. Changes in COMODO Mobile Security 2.7:

- Improved virus detection
- Optional password protection for application removal
- False positive feedback option
- Bug fixes

== Independent test labs ==
On June 17, 2013, AV-TEST Labs released test results of 30 Android mobile security products conducted in May 2013 using Android 4.2.2. Comodo Mobile Security 2.0 scored 5.5 of 6 for Protection and a perfect 6 for Usability in AV-TEST's two testing categories.

In January 2015, AV-TEST Labs released test results of 30 Android Mobile Security products conducted in January 2015 using Android 5.0.1 Comodo Mobile Security 2.7 scored 5.5 of 6 for Protection and a perfect 6 for Usability in AV-TEST's two testing categories.

== Reviews ==
Softonic.com reviewed Comodo Mobile Security 1.1 in January 2012 and gave it 9 of 10 stars, a rating of Excellent.

Rosemary Hattersley of PC Advisor gave Comodo Mobile Security 1.2 3 ½ of 5 stars. She wrote “this smartphone app is a good all-rounder, offering an initial health check, plus ‘anti-theft’ tools in the guise of remote lock, wipe and device location, plus an alert if someone changes the SIM in the phone, all for free."

== See also ==
- Comodo Dragon – Web browser based on the Chromium web browser
- Comodo IceDragon – Web browser
- Comodo Internet Security – Internet security software suite
- Comodo System Utilities
- Xcitium – Software company formerly named Comodo
