= Layering =

Layering may refer to:

- Layering (horticulture), a means of vegetative propagation
- Layering (finance), a strategy in high frequency trading
- Layering (linguistics), a principle by which grammaticalisation can be detected
- Surface layering, a quasi-crystalline structure at the surfaces of liquids
- Layering, a compositional technique in photography
- Layering, the use of abstraction layers in software and communication protocol design
- Layering, a step in the process of money laundering
- Layering, wearing layers of lightweight garments for warmth, known as layered clothing

== See also ==
- Layer (disambiguation)
