= AMSD =

AMSD may refer to:

- Advanced Multimedia System Design, developer of the AMSD Ariadna web browser
- Australian Message Stick Database, a database of the Cross-Linguistic Linked Data project
- Maritime Surveillance division of PAL Airlines
- Advanced Military Systems Design, former manufacturer of the SAN 511 rifle
