= Optic (disambiguation) =

Optics is a branch of physics that studies light.

Optic or Optics may also refer to:

- Optic, an alcoholic spirits measure, a device for dispensing fixed amounts of alcoholic spirits
- OpTic Gaming, an American esports organization
- Optics, a general class of bidirectional transformations in computer science
- OPTICS algorithm, an unsupervised learning clustering algorithm
- Optimized Protocol for Transport of Images to Clients used by iCentrix's MarioNet split web browser (OPTICS)
- "Optics" (Daredevil: Born Again), an episode of Daredevil: Born Again
- Optics (TV series), an Australian TV series

== See also ==
- Opticks, a treatise by Isaac Newton
