= DNS.com LLC =

- Type: Managed DNS Service
- Founded: 1991
- Founder: Dan Kimball, Brian Smith, Sean Stafford, Eric Radtke
- Headquarters: Louisville, Kentucky
- Area served: Worldwide
- Key people: Dan Kimball (CEO)
- Parent: Comodo Group, since 2011
- Website: securedns.dnsbycomodo.com

DNS.com LLC was an American Domain Name System service website which evolved into a brand. In March 2014 it was re-branded dnsbycomodo.com.

== History ==
The website, founded in 1991, was administrated by Dan Kimball (CEO), Brian Smith (CTO), Sean Stafford (COO) and Eric Radtke (CMO). In 2010, Comwired Inc. acquired the site and began offering its enterprise DNS service from it. In February 2011, DNS.com was acquired by cybersecurity company Comodo.

== See also ==
- DNS hosting service
- Anycast
