= Java Embedding Plugin =

Java Embedding Plugin (JEP) enables Java on Mac OS X with non-Safari browsers. This plugin is shipped with Firefox 1.5 on, and all recent versions of SeaMonkey and Camino.

The latest released version, 0.9.7.5, requires Mac OS X 10.4.11 or higher.

== History ==
Originally for the PowerPC based Macs, a port to Intel x86 was needed.

Version 0.9.6.1 had a security vulnerability that allowed remote attackers to crash the browser.

== See also ==
- Flash plugin
