= ThunderHawk =

Web browser

- ThunderHawk Screenshot
- Developer: Bitstream Inc.
- Initial release: December 2001
- Stable release: 3.00 / 2008
- Operating system: Java ME
- Type: Mobile browser
- License: Proprietary
- Website: bitstream.com Archived 27 August 2007 at the Wayback Machine

ThunderHawk is a discontinued web browser from Bitstream available for a full range of operating systems in high end (Windows mobile and Symbian browsers) and mass-market (Java browser) mobile phones and personal digital assistants. It is basically meant for mobile operators and original equipment manufacturers and not meant to download for normal users.

Unlike most browsers, ThunderHawk does not re-purpose or reformat the content, and provides a similar desktop view of the web page. Data is transmitted to the mobile phone in a compressed transport format, for example, the visible web page regions (text) are received first, while the rest of the images and other data are automatically transferred in the background.

== Version history ==
Bitstream announced the ThunderHawk technology first on June 6, 2001 in Cambridge. The official beta release went off on October 9, 2001 and included enhancements as improved readability, speed, and usability. Sonera, wireless carrier in Finland included the beta release of Bitstream's web browser technology in Sonera Pilot Program to offer hands-on testing of new UI conventions for future mobile applications.

Later, in the same year, December 17, 2001 Bitstream announced the Wireless Web browsing solution with HP for its HP Jornada PDA customers. The first full-featured Wireless Web Browser for Pocket PCs was released on May 20, 2002.

== Standards Supported ==
AJAX, DHTML Level 1, DOM Level 1, DOM Level 2, CSS Level 1, CSS Level 2, Frames, HTML 4.01, HTTP 1.0, HTTP 1.1, HTTPS 128-bit encryption, Feeds (RSS, ATOM, RDF), Image formats (BMP, GIF, JPEG, PNG, PJPEG), XHTML Basic, XML 1.0, ECMA Script, WML, WAP 2.0.

== Functionality ==
When a subscriber uses ThunderHawk to access the Web, the ThunderHawk client residing on the handset communicates with the server. The server receives a connection from the client and requests an HTML Web page from the Internet. Upon receiving the requested page, the server renders the content on-the-fly and compresses the graphics. The server sends the requested HTML page in a compact transport format to the subscriber's handset.

ThunderHawk's split-screen mode allowing browsing in both overview and magnified view

ThunderHawk can run on any handset that offers MIDP 2.0, CLDC 1.0 and/or CLDC 1.1 software. The browser uses Bitstream's patented technologies for mobile browsing. To display digital content on a small screen device, ThunderHawk accesses the Web site, lays out the content at a virtual pixel resolution and then displays a part of the layout at a smaller display resolution. The displayed content is at a scaled-down resolution size and includes text composed from font bitmaps having character shapes, sizes, and pixel alignments selected to improve readability.

=== Split-Screen Mode ===
ThunderHawk allows browsing in the combined overview and magnified view of a web page. The split screen magnifier makes it easier to browse the Web pages in their original format on the small screen of a mobile device. The floating magnifier over the overview area, available with both Zoom-In and Zoom-Out mode aids in finding information and navigating the Web sites. Bitstream holds the patent rights for this split-screen technology.

=== Rendering Modes ===
ThunderHawk can show the Web page content in various user enable modes including, overview only, magnified only, and a re-flown single column text view.

== Features ==
- Supports viewing of AJAX pages that are written using ECMA-262/JavaScript 1.5 standard.
- Supports full HTML browsing on the Java ME, Symbian, or Windows Mobile phone.
- Includes HTTPS 128-bit encryption, providing a secure transmission of confidential data.
- Customizable options: A "split screen/full screen" feature that eliminates the need of excessive scrolling. The "History" and "favorites" lists provide fast access to your favorite sites.
- Offers a choice of viewing the mobile version or the desktop version of a Web page.
- Provides image quality control options (low, medium, or high) that reduce the data transferred. The better the quality, higher the color depth and information each image will contain, and more the amount of data transfer. As the quality decreases, the image rendered will have less color depth and information, and hence lesser the download bytes.
- Persistent cookie support, with cookies stored on the server, which decreases the data transfer time.
- Validates certificates for https sites; if there are certificate problems, informs the user and gives the choice to continue browsing the site.
- Incremental rendering that sends visible Web page region first, while the rest of the images and other data are automatically transferred in the background.
- Support to submit web forms and view drop down menus on a mobile device.
- Native character support, ability to view web sites in multiple languages (Western and Eastern European).
- Allows choosing the content size with 5 different levels of magnification.
- Support to bypass or view popup windows.
- Supports playing videos for player-enabled handsets.
- Based on platform capability, ability to use smoothened or monochrome fonts.
- Supports both landscape and portrait viewing

== See also ==
- Amazon Silk
- History of web browsers
- List of web browsers
- MarioNet split web browser
- Opera Mini
