= Wikiseek =

English Wikipedia pages search engine

- Website type: search engine
- Available in: English
- Owner: SearchMe
- Creator: SearchMe
- Registration: no
- Launched: January 17, 2007
- Current status: Inactive

Wikiseek was a search engine that indexed English Wikipedia pages and pages that were linked to from Wikipedia articles. The search engine was funded by a Palo Alto based Internet startup SearchMe and was officially launched on January 17, 2007. Most of the funding came from Sequoia Capital. It used Google ads on its search returns to generate profit. As of 2008 it is no longer active.

Wikiseek was granted permission by the Wikimedia Foundation to index the Wikipedia website. Wikiseek has made financial contributions to the Wikimedia Foundation, and the group-edited blog, TechCrunch reported that it was donating the "majority" of advertising revenue.

Wikipedia pages were re-indexed whenever Wikipedia had a database clean-up; external links were re-indexed weekly. Search results included tag clouds of Wikipedia categories that contained the search term. The first three results of any search would always be Wikipedia articles, and the remainder were a mix of Wikipedia content and websites linked to from Wikipedia. The service used user feedback to reduce the likelihood of spam.

TechCrunch commented that the search engine may cause confusion with the Wikia search engine that had been announced the month previous to Wikiseek's launch.
