= DigitalStyle =

1995–1997 small private software company in San Diego, California

DigitalStyle was a small privately held software company in Rancho Bernardo, San Diego, California. It was founded in 1995 by former employees of the failed software company Pages including Rick Gessner, Peter Linss, Greg Kostello, and James Hamerly. Additional talent for DigitalStyle came from a Xerox spinoff Chrystal Software including Steve Clark, Beth Epperson, and Don Vale.

Its flagship product, WebSuite, was a leading web site creation tool in the late 1990s. WebSuite provided advanced graphics and web page editing capabilities for novice authors, though it was also powerful enough for advanced authors. It was one of the first commercial programs to support PNG.

DigitalStyle was acquired by Netscape in 1997 due largely to their expertise in HTML layout and web technologies. James Hamerly became Netscape's vice president of the client products group. Rick Gessner became Netscape's Director of Engineering. Integrating with the existing Netscape client development team, this group contributed to the design and implementation of the Gecko layout engine that powers many of the products under the Mozilla open source umbrella such as Firefox.
