= Camino (web browser) =

Discontinued open-source web browser

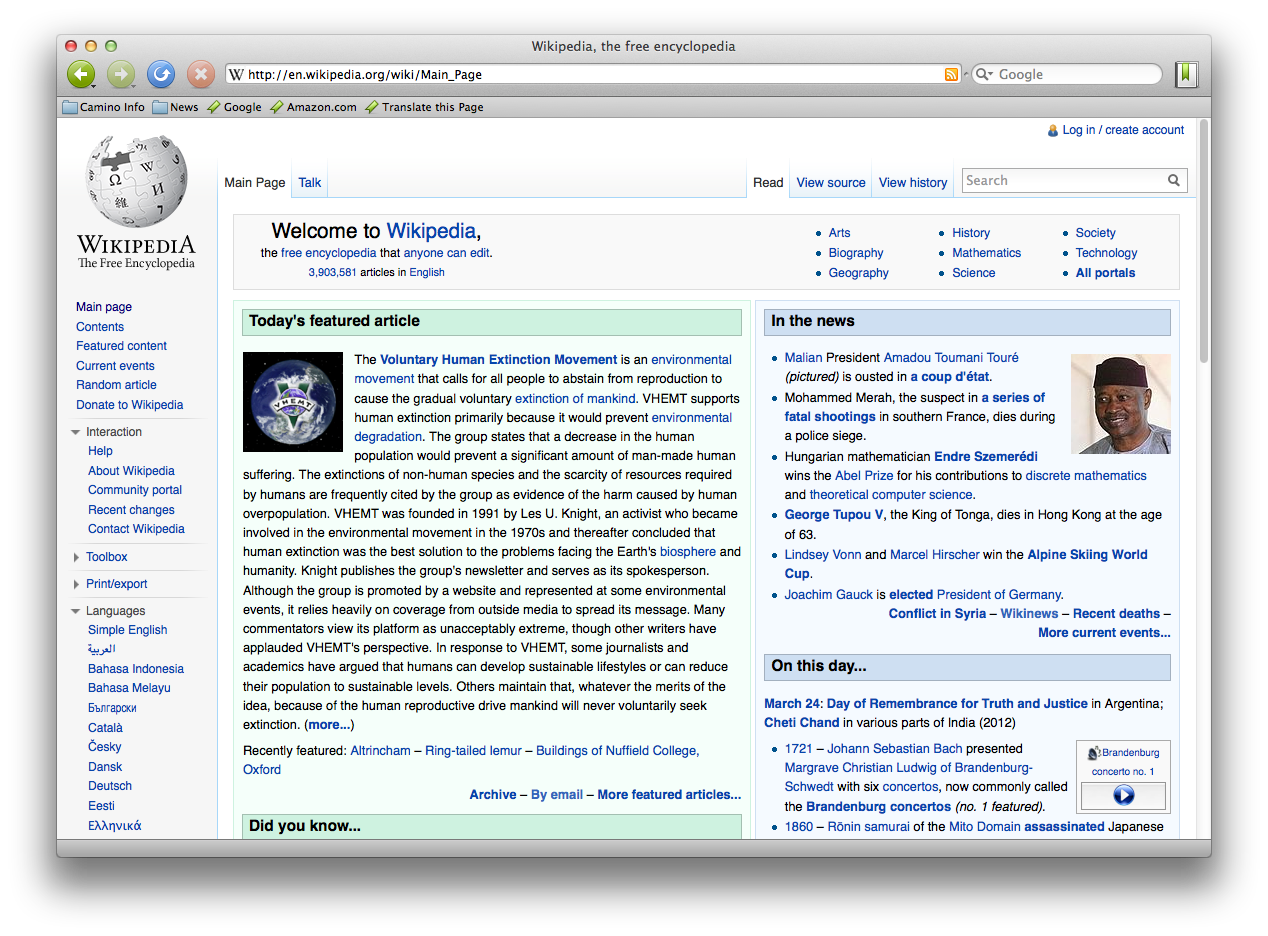
- Camino 2.1 under Mac OS X 10.7 Lion
- Developer: The Camino Project
- Release: February 13, 2002; 24 years ago
- Final release: 2.1.2 / 14 March 2012; 14 years ago
- Written in: Objective-C Cocoa
- Operating system: macOS
- Available in: Multilingual
- Type: Web browser Feed reader
- License: MPL 1.1/ GPL 2.0/ LGPL 2.1 tri-license
- Website: caminobrowser.org

Camino (from the Spanish word camino meaning "path") is a discontinued free, open source, GUI-based Web browser based on Mozilla's Gecko layout engine and specifically designed for the OS X operating system. In place of an XUL-based user interface used by most Mozilla-based applications, Camino used Mac-native Cocoa APIs. On May 30, 2013, the Camino Project announced that the browser is no longer being developed.

As Camino's aim was to integrate as well as possible with OS X, it used the Aqua user interface and integrated a number of OS X services and features such as the Keychain for password management and Bonjour for scanning available bookmarks across the local network. Other notable features included an integrated pop-up blocker and ad blocker, and tabbed browsing that included an overview feature allowing tabs to be viewed all at once as pages.

The browser was developed by the Camino Project, a community organization. Mike Pinkerton had been the technical lead of the Camino project since Dave Hyatt moved to the Safari team at Apple Inc. in mid-2002.

== History ==
Camino timeline
Version	Date
0.1	February 13, 2002
0.2	April 6, 2002
0.4	July 24, 2002
0.5	September 9, 2002
0.6	November 5, 2002
0.7	March 6, 2003
0.8	June 25, 2004
1.0	February 14, 2006
1.5	June 5, 2007
1.6	April 17, 2008
2.0	November 18, 2009
2.0.7	March 22, 2011
2.0.8	September 9, 2011
2.0.9	September 14, 2011
2.1	November 29, 2011

In late 2001, Mike Pinkerton and Vidur Apparao started a project within Netscape to prove that Gecko could be embedded in a Cocoa application. In early 2002 Dave Hyatt, one of the co-creators of Firefox (then called Phoenix), joined the team and built Chimera, a small, lightweight browser wrapper, around their work. "Chimera" is a mythological beast with parts taken from various animals and as the new browser represented an early example of Carbon/C++ code interacting with Cocoa/Objective-C code, the name must have seemed apt.

The first downloadable build of Chimera 0.1 was released on February 13, 2002. The early releases became popular due to their fast page-loading speeds (as compared with then-dominant Mac browser, Microsoft's Internet Explorer version 5 or OmniGroup's OmniWeb, which then used the Cocoa text system as its rendering engine).

Hyatt was hired by Apple Computer in mid-2002 to start work on what would become Safari. Meanwhile, the Chimera developers got a small team together within Netscape, with dedicated development and QA, to put together a Netscape-branded technology preview for the January 2003 Macworld Conference. However, two days before the show, AOL management decided to abandon the entire project. Despite this setback, a skeleton crew of QA and developers released Camino 0.7 on March 3, 2003.

The name was changed from Chimera to Camino for legal reasons. Because of its roots in Greek mythology, Chimera has been a popular choice of name for hypermedia systems. One of the first graphical web browsers was called Chimera, and researchers at the University of California, Irvine, have also developed a complete hypermedia system of the same name. Camino is Spanish for "path" or "road" (as in El Camino Real, a.k.a. the Royal Road), and the name was chosen to continue the "Navigator" motif.

While version 0.7 was primarily a Netscape-driven release kept afloat at the end by open source, version 0.8 was, according to lead developer Pinkerton, "a triumph of open source and open process. People from all around the world helped with patches, QA, bug triage, localization, artwork, and evangelism."

In March 2005, Camino's Web site was moved from the Mozilla Foundation's domain mozilla.org to the Camino Project's domain caminobrowser.org.

In September 2005, Pinkerton accepted a position at Google where he worked closely with Google's Firefox team and continued to work on Camino during his "twenty percent" time.

Camino 1.0, released on February 14, 2006, was the first browser of the Mozilla family to appear as a universal binary, thanks largely to the efforts of Mark Mentovai, another of the Camino developers.

Camino 2.0, released on November 18, 2009, introduced many new interface features to the browser including movable tabs and tab preview. It was the first Camino release to be Acid2-compliant.

With the release of Camino 2.1 in 2011, the developers announced plans to transition to WebKit for future versions, as Mozilla had dropped support for Gecko embedding.

The final release was 2.1.2 released on March 14, 2012.

On May 30, 2013, Stuart Morgan announced on Camino Blog that Camino had reached its end and was no longer being developed.

== Standards compliance ==
Camino 2.0, released on November 18, 2009, introduced many new interface features to the browser including moveable tabs and tab preview. It was the first Camino release to be Acid2-compliant.

The final release (2.1.2) scores a 99/100 on the Acid3 test.

Camino's HTML5 support via the HTML5test standards testbed is limited.

== Multilingual support ==
Camino 2.1.2 is available in the following languages:

- Dutch
- German
- English (US)
- French
- Italian
- Japanese
- Swedish
- Chinese (Simplified)
- Norwegian
- Spanish

== Version compatibility ==
OS X version	Latest version	Gecko release
v10.1	0.8.5	1.7.6
v10.2.8	1.0.6	1.8.0.13
v10.3.0	1.5.5	1.8.1.12
v10.3.9	1.6.11	1.8.1.24
v10.4	2.1.2	1.9.2.28
v10.5	2.1.2	1.9.2.28
v10.6	2.1.2	1.9.2.28
v10.7	2.1.2	1.9.2.28
v10.8	2.1.2	1.9.2.28

== See also ==
- Browser timeline
- Comparison of web browsers
- List of web browsers
- Java Embedding Plugin
- K-Meleon
