= Thunderhawk =

Thunderhawk may refer to:

- Thunder Hawk, a character from the Street Fighter fighting games
- Thunder Hawk, South Dakota, a community in the United States
- Thunderhawk (Dorney Park), a roller coaster at Dorney Park & Wildwater Kingdom amusement park
- Thunderhawk (Michigan's Adventure), a roller coaster at Michigan's Adventure formerly located at Geauga Lake & Wildwater Kingdom
- Thunderhawk (video game), a 1992 helicopter based video game by Core Design
  - Firestorm: Thunderhawk 2, a 1995 sequel to Thunderhawk
  - Thunderhawk: Operation Phoenix, a 2001 sequel to Firestorm: Thunderhawk 2
- ThunderHawk (web browser) by Bitstream Inc.
