= Mike Parker (typographer) =

Typographer and type designer

Mike Russell Parker
- Born: 1929; London
- Died: February 23, 2014; Portland, Maine
- Occupations: Typographer and type designer
- Known for: Directing Mergenthaler Linotype Company; founding Bitstream Inc.

Mike Russell Parker (1929 - February 23, 2014) was a British-born American typographer and type designer.

Parker is known for rediscovering a "nameless Roman" type font and preparing it as a Starling series for Font Bureau.

== Life and career ==
Parker was born in London in 1929, the son of a geologist Russell Johnson Parker. Russell Parker was murdered in the 1949 bombing of Canadian Pacific Air Lines Flight 108. He had intended to follow his father into the profession, but was prevented from doing do due to colorblindness. He attended Yale University. He graduated with a degree in architecture and a master's in design. He then worked at the Plantin-Moretus Museum in Antwerp.

Parker joined the Mergenthaler Linotype Company as Jackson Burke's assistant and heir; within two years becoming Director. Under Parker's leadership over 1,000 typefaces, including Helvetica, were added to the library making them available wherever Linotype equipment was in use, including complete series of Hebrew and Greek scripts. This was made possible through Parker’s organization of shared typeface development between the five separate companies in the Linotype Group worldwide. Parker was responsible for bringing in internationally known designers such as Matthew Carter, Adrian Frutiger and Hermann Zapf. The result was a library that became the standard of the industry.

In 1981, Parker left Mergenthaler with Matthew Carter, Cherie Cone, and Rob Friedman to co-found Bitstream Inc, a type design company, in Cambridge, Massachusetts. While revenues from the sale of typesetting equipment were dwindling, they recognized a business opportunity in the design and sale of type itself, due to the changing technologies that allowed type to be independent of equipment. Bitstream, largely financed through prepayment for the type library by several newly formed imagesetting companies, developed a library of digital type that could be licensed for use by anyone. Bitstream was highly successful during the 1980s when digital design and production, desktop publishing and personal computer use became virtually universal in the Western World.

Parker was featured in the film Helvetica, a feature-length independent film about typography, graphic design and global visual culture. He wrote the introduction for the re-issue of Stanley Morison's A Tally of Types, published by David Godine.

In mid-1990, Parker, along with Victor Spindler, a professional graphic designer, founded Pages Software Inc to create a design-oriented desktop publishing software package. Venture funding was secured by the end of 1991, and the product -- Pages by Pages—shipped in March 1994 for the NeXTSTEP platform. Over the next 14 months, successive commercial versions were released, including a web-page editor. However, the small NeXTSTEP installed base was insufficient to support the company, and it closed its doors in mid-1995.

Upon the closing of Pages Software in 1995, Parker licensed the Pages patent to Design Intelligence in Seattle and joined the company as an in-house consultant. In 2000, Design Intelligence was bought by Microsoft. With that, Parker had come full circle, he had completed a process that began with Gutenberg's transformation of flexible but laborious calligraphy into modular fonts of movable type, and ended with similar digital modules of expert design that guide all aspects of a whole document's appearance.

In 1994, Parker published evidence that the design of Times New Roman, credited to Stanley Morison in 1931 was based on Starling Burgess' 1904 drawings for Lanston Monotype Foundry. This publication attracted the attention of Roger Black, noted design director and former avid Linotype customer, and David Berlow former colleague at both Linotype and Bitstream. Parker joined their co-founded company, the Font Bureau, as a Consultant, Type Historian and Type Designer. In 2009, Parker released "Starling", a Roman font with a matching italic series based on the 1904 design of William Starling Burgess.

Parker died on February 23, 2014.

== Timeline ==
- 1951: BA Architecture, Yale University
- 1952–1954: US Army Korea
- 1956 MFA: Graphic School of Design, Yale University
- 1956–1957: Typographic Project for I.M. Pei
- 1957–1959: Plantin Moretus Museum, Antwerp
- 1959–1981: Mergenthaler Linotype Company
- 1981–1987: Bitstream Inc.
- 1987–1989: The Company
- 1990–1995: Pages Software, Inc.
- 1996–1999: Design Intelligence, Inc.
- 2000–2014: Font Bureau

== Other source ==
- Interview, September 2010, recorded by Frank Romano, RIT Professor Emeritus, detailed Parker's life and work.
