= Bitstream Inc. =

American type foundry (1981–2012)

- Type: Public
- Traded as: Nasdaq: BITS
- Industry: Type foundry, mobile phone web browsers
- Founded: 1981; 45 years ago
- Founder: Cherie Cone; Matthew Carter; Mike Parker
- Defunct: March 19, 2012
- Fate: Acquired by Monotype
- Headquarters: Marlborough, Massachusetts, United States
- Key people: Amos Kaminski (chairman and Interim CEO)
- Number of employees: 96

Bitstream Inc. was an American type foundry that produced digital typefaces. It was founded in 1981 by Matthew Carter, Mike Parker, Cherie Cone, and Rob Friedman, all former employees of the Mergenthaler Linotype Company. It was located in Marlborough, Massachusetts. The font business, including MyFonts, was acquired by Monotype Imaging in March 2012. The remainder of the business, responsible for Pageflex and Bolt Browser, was spun off to a new entity named Marlborough Software Development Holdings Inc. It was later renamed Pageflex, Inc following a successful management buyout in December 2013.

== Products ==
Bitstream created a library of "classic" digital fonts, usually under different names, initially drawing from the Linotype library. For example, Times Ten was released as Dutch 801, Bembo as Aldine 401, Eurostile as Square 721, Frutiger as Humanist 777, Gill Sans as Humanist 521, and Univers as Zurich. In the United States, while the names of typefaces can be trademarked, the typefaces themselves are not copyrightable, allowing anyone to digitize existing fonts and redistribute them under a new name. While a success, Bitstream received criticism for its strategy of cheaply offering digitizations of pre-existing typefaces that it had not designed, with font designer John Hudson saying that "the development of the original Bitstream library was one of the worst instances of piracy in the history of type." The company distributed fonts with metrics matching PostScript fonts, making it possible for output from software clones of PostScript to match the original. The Bitstream font collection became widely used through its inclusion with the CorelDRAW software, as well as other Corel products such as WordPerfect.

Bitstream also developed a number of original fonts, such as Amerigo, by Gerard Unger Charter, by Matthew Carter, Carmina by Gudrun Zapf, Chianti by Dennis Pasternak, Iowan Old Style by John Downer, Arrus by Richard Lipton and the open source Bitstream Vera family of fonts.

One of their best known fonts is Swiss 721 BT, which is a Helvetica variant with condensed versions and a rounded version. It was among the first digitally available Swiss family typefaces, being designed for that purpose in 1982.

Another Bitstream product is Font Fusion, a font rasterizing engine developed jointly with Type Solutions, Inc., which was later owned entirely by Bitstream.

The multi-byte character set was named Bitstream International Character Set (BICS).

== History ==
The company had a high level of involvement in BeOS, with older BeOS releases using a Bitstream renderer, and the latest development releases from 2001 using Font Fusion. The OS, including its freeware releases, included a large number of Bitstream fonts, including their versions of Times New Roman, Helvetica and Courier.

On December 2, 1998, Bitstream Inc. announced acquisition of all outstanding stock of Type Solutions, Inc. In addition, Sampo Kaasila, its founder and president and the creator of TrueType, agreed to join Bitstream's team as Director of Research and Development.

In January 1999, Bitstream launched MyFonts, an open marketplace offering fonts from various foundries and a forum where users could interact with type experts.

In January 2009, Bitstream introduced the BOLT Browser, a Java ME-based Web browser for mobile phones. It was distributed free of charge to consumers and was built using the company's ThunderHawk mobile Web browsing technology for mobile network operators and handset manufacturers. The product was discontinued by the end of 2011.

== See also ==
- Bitstream Charter
- Bitstream Cyberbit – Unicode serif typeface
- Bitstream Vera – Typeface series from Bitstream
- Bolt (web browser)
- Corel – Software company headquartered in Ottawa, Ontario
- Mike Parker (typographer) – Typographer and type designer
- MyFonts – Digital fonts distributor
- ThunderHawk – Web browser
- TrueDoc – Outline font format for web pages
