= ZAC Browser =

Web browser for autistic children and teenagers

- ZAC Browser 1.1.7 running on Windows XP
- Developer: People CD Inc.
- Final release: Gold / June 10, 2009
- Operating system: Microsoft Windows
- Type: Web Browser
- License: Proprietary EULA
- Website: zacbrowser.com

ZAC Browser (Zone for Autistic Children) was a web browser designed specifically for children with autism spectrum disorder.

Because autistic children display characteristics such as impairments in social interaction, impairments in communication, special interests, and repetitive behavior, the standard browser experience is often overwhelming for children with the condition. ZAC browser reduced the number of user interface controls and removed access to much of the web in order to simplify the experience for autistic children. The browser shut down on April 2, 2026.

== History ==
John LeSieur had a grandson named Zack who was diagnosed with autism at the age of 3. Because of the autism, the child was often very frustrated when using the computer. LeSieur owned People CD Inc., a software production company, and released a web browser for children called KidCD in 2006. KidCD proved helpful for Zack, as he was able to use the computer on his own.

In 2008, KidCD 2.0 was released and added a feature that automatically switched icons on the screen. This feature was problematic for autistic children, who generally prefer very organized displays. LeSieur then developed an alternative version of KidCD 2.0, called ZAC Browser, which added aquarium graphics to the main page along with stationary icons. The specialty browser was designed to enable children with autism to use and benefit from the same types of websites other children use, including Sesame Street and PBS Kids.

== System requirements ==
	Minimum Requirement
Operating system	Windows 98/ME/2000/XP/Vista/7
Processor	200 MHz or higher
RAM	256 MB
Free hard drive space	10 MB

== See also ==
- List of web browsers
