= Epic (web browser) =

Indian Web Browser based on chromium

- Epic Browser on Windows 11
- Developer: Hidden Reflex
- Release: July 15, 2010; 16 years ago
- Stable release: Version 152.0.7977.6 (Official Build) (32-bit) / June 16, 2026; 3 months ago
- Engine: Blink
- Operating system: Windows, macOS, Android, iOS
- License: Proprietary
- Website: www.epicbrowser.com

Epic is an Indian proprietary privacy-centric web browser developed by Hidden Reflex using Chromium source code. Epic is always in private browsing mode, and exiting the browser deletes all browser data. The browser's developers claim that Google's tracking code has been removed, and that blocks other companies from tracking the user.

== History ==
Epic changed its browser engine from Firefox to Chromium on August 29, 2013, with some features for Indian users specifically. The browser integrates widgets such as social networking, chat clients, and email facilities.

== Features ==
Epic's default configuration removes session data (such as cookies, history, and cache) upon closing the browser. The browser includes a proxy service that can be enabled by the user, and is automatically enabled when using a search engine. The browser also prefers SSL connections and always sends a Do Not Track header.

AD and user activity trackers (e.g. cookies) are blocked by default by the Epic browser. The browser also blocks cryptocurrency miners from running on the user's system. The browsers' fingerprinting protection blocks access to image canvas, font canvas, and audio context data. WebRTC IP Address Leaking is also blocked by default.

The Epic Proxy service was deprecated in the latest version.

Supplementary services found in the Chromium browser that send data to external servers, such as address bar suggestion and installation tracking, are removed in Epic to reduce the scope of potential data leakage.

== Critical reception ==
Computerworld published an article on Epic in the month of July 2020. The article describes many of the features claimed by Epic, such as blocking of ads, tracking, referrer header data, and "fingerprint", proxy/VPN. As Google's servers are not used, functions such as auto-suggest in the address box and language translation are either handled by Epic locally or not available. The article says that the Epic FAQ warns users not to sign into their Gmail account: "if you're logged into Gmail, then Google can track your searches". Very few Chrome add-ons are supported due to privacy risk. Some sites do not work with Epic; in those cases the IE Tab add-on will open the page in Internet Explorer. According to owner Hidden Reflex, the company was working on a way to sustain itself, perhaps offering premium privacy services, sponsors on the new tab page, and private search sponsors.

While Epic is not open source software, the company states that it will release files to be audited.

== See also ==
- List of web browsers
