= Zen Browser =

Open source Firefox-based web browser

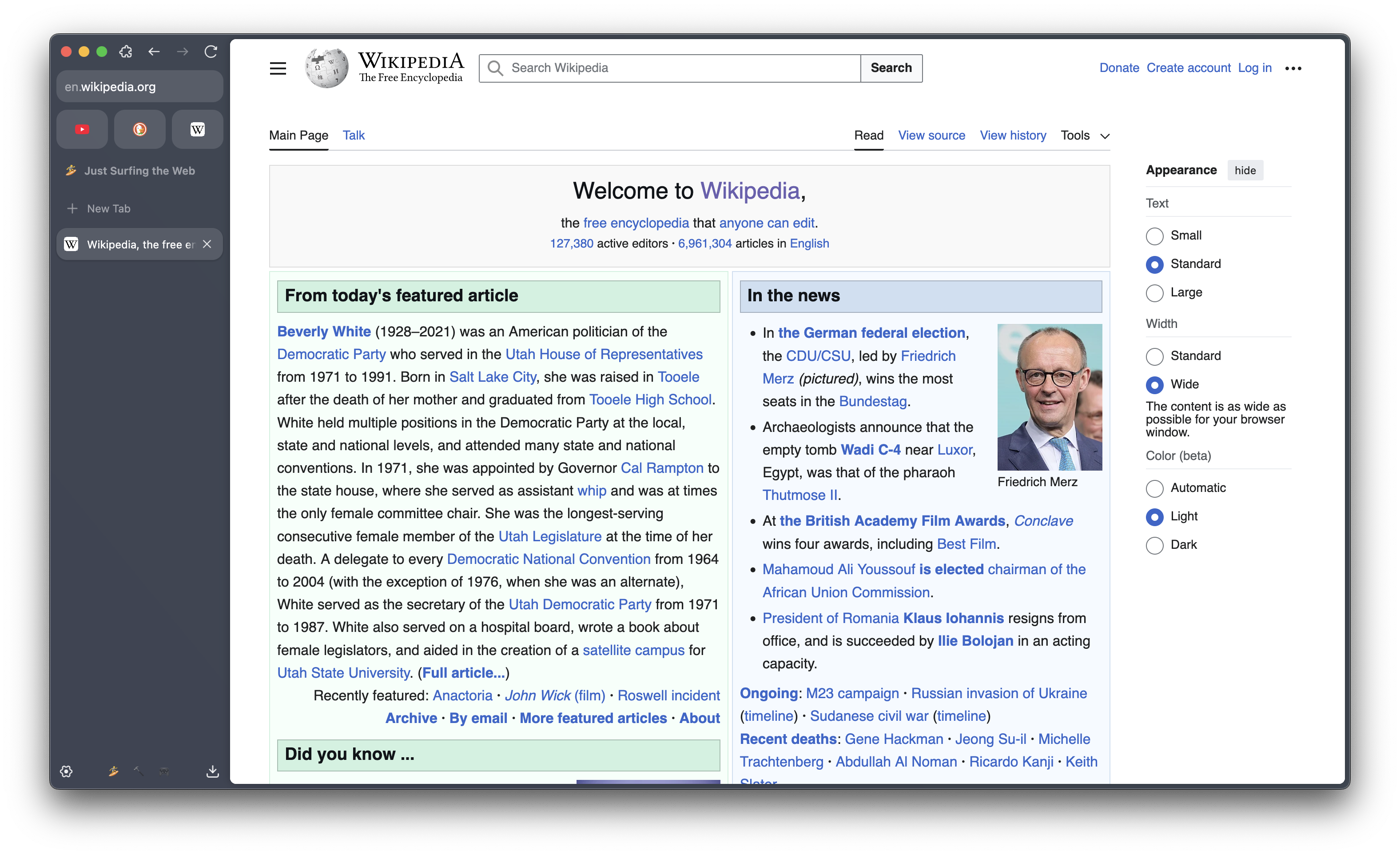
- Zen Browser 1.8.2b on macOS
- Developer: Zen Browser Team
- Release: July 11, 2024
- Stable release: 1.23.4b / 21 October 2026; 5 days ago
- Written in: C++, JavaScript, CSS, HTML
- Engine: Gecko
- Operating system: Windows, macOS, Linux
- License: Mozilla Public License 2.0
- Website: zen-browser.app
- Repository: github.com/zen-browser/desktop

Zen Browser is a free and open-source fork of Firefox introduced in 2024, with a focus on privacy, customizability, and design.

Zen Browser includes many of the layout changes and features associated with Arc, a Chromium-based web browser built by The Browser Company in 2022. Since The Browser Company announced that Arc was no longer going to receive new features, Zen Browser has been considered a major alternative and a continuation in spirit.

It is licensed under the terms of the Mozilla Public License 2.0.

== Compatibility ==
Zen Browser is compatible with Microsoft Windows, macOS and Linux.

The Linux version is available for download as a Flatpak, AppImage and as a Tarball.

Each of the app versions is available for x86_64 and ARM64.

== Features ==
Zen Browser is compatible with Firefox browser extensions, and offers browser synchronization through a Mozilla account.

=== Tab management ===
Zen Browser presents a vertical list of tabs in a sidebar –a design pattern associated with Arc, although also present in earlier browsers such as Vivaldi and Microsoft Edge. This sidebar can be displayed on the left or right side of the window, and there is a Compact Mode which auto-hides it.

Zen Browser can be grouped into workspaces, which separates tabs within the same window and shows one set at a time, allowing for grouping by topic or project. Similarly to Opera, tabs can be pinned separately in specific workspaces.

Tabs in the same workspace can be displayed together in Split View, a tiled interface within a single Zen window.

Glance opens a link in a modal view that is more easily dismissed than a new tab. It is invoked by clicking a link while holding a modifier key. The feature is based on Arc's Peek function (confused with tabless "Little Arc" windows in several reviews).

Tab folders were added in August 2025. Tab folders are similar to tab groups found in other browsers like Chrome and Firefox, with the key difference that tab folders can be nested.

=== Customization ===
Zen Browser's user interface can be themed with color gradients and texture.

Zen Mods (formerly called Themes Store) is a collection of user-generated theme add-ons designed to further customize Zen's interface. As of February 12, 2025, 79 mods are available.

=== Others ===
- JPEG XL animated image support

== Reception ==
Liam Proven from The Register praised Zen for being "free of Google code", having more usable implementations of Arc's features, and being compatible with older versions of operating systems, focusing on the vertical tab bar and tiling capabilities.

Jack Wallen of ZDNet recommended Zen for improving on Firefox's customization and tab management, listing several Zen Mods to indicate its customizability.

Writing for XDA, Adam Conway considered Zen to "combine the best of Floorp, Vivaldi, Firefox, and Chrome", noting the developer's willingness to add popularly requested features, and emphasizing the browser's detachment from Google's "web rendering monopoly". Conway described incompatibility with DRM-protected content as the "only major downside", while suggesting that software bugs that had drawn earlier criticism had been corrected.
