= Xcitium =

Software company formerly named Comodo

- Type: Private
- Industry: Computer software
- Founded: United Kingdom (1998; 28 years ago)
- Headquarters: Bloomfield, New Jersey, United States
- Area served: Worldwide
- Key people: Melih Abdulhayoğlu (President and Chairman)
- Number of employees: 1,200+
- Website: www.xcitium.com

Xcitium (formerly Comodo Group and Comodo Security Solutions Inc.) is a cybersecurity company, including Zero Trust cybersecurity, based in Bloomfield, New Jersey, United States. In 2022, the company rebranded as Xcitium.

== History ==
The company was founded in 1998 in the United Kingdom by Melih Abdulhayoğlu. It relocated to the United States in 2004. Its products focused on computer and internet security, including the operation of an SSL certificate authority, Comodo Certification Authority. The firm helped set standards by contributing to the Internet Engineering Task Force DNS Certification Authority Authorization Resource Record. In 2017, Francisco Partners acquired Comodo Certificate Authority from Comodo Security Solutions, Inc., and the next year rebranded it as Sectigo.

In February 2011, Comodo Group acquired DNS.com LLC, which provides managed Domain Name System (DNS) services.

== Products ==
- Comodo Dragon (web browser)
- Comodo Ice Dragon (web browser)
- Comodo Internet Security
- Comodo System Utilities
- Comodo Mobile Security

== Industry affiliations ==
In 2005, Comodo was a founding member of the CA/Browser Forum, a consortium of certificate authorities and web browser vendors dedicated to promoting industry standards and baseline requirements for internet security. Melih Abdulhayoğlu invited browser providers and certificate authorities to a round table to discuss the creation of a central authority responsible for delivering digital certificate issuance best practice guidelines.

In 2009 Comodo was a founding member of the Common Computing Security Standards Forum (CCSF), an industry organization that promotes industry standards that protect end users.

In February 2013, Comodo became a founding member of the Certificate Authority Security Council (CASC), an industry advocacy organization dedicated to addressing industry issues and educating the public on internet security.

== Controversies ==
=== Certificate hacking ===
On 23 March 2011, Comodo posted a report that 8 days earlier, on 15 March 2011, a user account with an affiliate registration authority had been compromised and was used to create a new user account that issued nine certificate signing requests. Nine certificates for seven domains were issued. The attack was traced to IP address 212.95.136.18, which originates in Tehran, Iran. Moxie Marlinspike analyzed the IP address on his website the next day and found it to have English localization and Windows operating system. Though the firm initially reported that the breach was the result of a "state-driven attack", it subsequently stated that the origin of the attack may be the "result of an attacker attempting to lay a false trail.". The talk by Moxie at Def Con suggested the attacker may have been inexperienced and following online tutorials for man-in-the-middle attacks.

Comodo revoked all of the bogus certificates shortly after the breach was discovered. Comodo also stated that it was actively looking into ways to improve the security of its affiliates.

In an update on 31 March 2011, Comodo stated that it detected and thwarted an intrusion into a reseller user account on 26 March 2011. The new controls implemented by Comodo following the incident on 15 March 2011, removed any risk of the fraudulent issue of certificates. Comodo believed the attack was from the same perpetrator as the incident on 15 March 2011.

In regards to this second incident, Comodo stated, "Our CA infrastructure was not compromised. Our keys in our HSMs were not compromised. No certificates have been fraudulently issued. The attempt to fraudulently access the certificate ordering platform to issue a certificate failed."

On 26 March 2011, a person under the username "ComodoHacker" verified that they were the attacker by posting the private keys online and posted a series of messages detailing how poor Comodo's security is and bragging about their abilities. There was at least 4 hacks on Comodo and their certificate reseller that year.

As of 2016, all of the certificates remain revoked. Microsoft issued a security advisory and update to address the issue at the time of the event.

=== Certificates issued to known malware distributors ===
In 2009 Microsoft MVP Michael Burgess accused Comodo of issuing digital certificates to known malware distributors. Comodo responded when notified and revoked the certificates in question, which were used to sign the known malware.

=== Let's Encrypt trademark registration application ===
In October 2015, Comodo applied for "Let's Encrypt", "Comodo Let's Encrypt", and "Let's Encrypt with Comodo" trademarks. These trademark applications were filed almost a year after the Internet Security Research Group, parent organization of Let's Encrypt, started using the name Let's Encrypt publicly in November 2014, and despite the fact Comodo's "intent to use" trademark filings acknowledge that it has never used "Let's Encrypt" as a brand.

On 24 June 2016, Comodo publicly posted in its forum that it had filed for "express abandonment" of their trademark applications.

Comodo's Chief Technical Officer Robin Alden said, "Comodo has filed for express abandonment of the trademark applications at this time instead of waiting and allowing them to lapse. Following collaboration between Let's Encrypt and Comodo, the trademark issue is now resolved and behind us, and we'd like to thank the Let's Encrypt team for helping to bring it to a resolution."

== See also ==
- Internet security
