= Multilevel =

Multilevel or multi-level may refer to:

- A hierarchy, a system where items are arranged in an "above-below" relation.
- A system that is composed of several layers.
- Bombardier MultiLevel Coach, a passenger rail car by Bombardier.
