= Surface layering =

Surface layering is a quasi-crystalline structure at the surfaces of otherwise disordered liquids, where atoms or molecules of even the simplest liquid are stratified into well-defined layers parallel to the surface. While in crystalline solids such atomic layers can extend periodically throughout the entire dimension of a crystal, surface layering decays rapidly away from the surface and is limited to just a few near-surface region layers. Another difference between surface layering and crystalline structure is that atoms or molecules of surface-layered liquids are not ordered in-plane, while in crystalline solids they are.

Surface layering was predicted theoretically by Stuart Rice at the University of Chicago in 1983 and has been experimentally discovered by Peter Pershan (Harvard) and his group, working in collaboration with Ben Ocko (Brookhaven) and Moshe Deutsch (Bar-Ilan) in 1995 in elemental liquid mercury and liquid gallium using x-ray reflectivity techniques.

More recently layering has been shown to arise from electronic properties of metallic liquids, rather than thermodynamic variables such as surface tension, since surfaces of low-surface tension metallic liquids such as liquid potassium are layered, while those of dielectric liquids such as water, are not.
