= Puffin Browser =

Web browser

- Developers: CloudMosa, Inc.
- Release: November 23, 2010; 15 years ago

Stable release(s) [±]
- Puffin Secure Browser(Windows) 9.0.1.757 (August 20, 2021; 5 years ago) [±] Puffin Web Browser(iOS) 5.2.6 (March 4, 2021; 5 years ago) [±] Puffin Web Browser(Android) 9.5.1.51115 (December 9, 2021; 4 years ago) [±] Puffin Incognito Browser(Android) 9.4.0.50938 (October 4, 2021; 5 years ago) [±] Puffin Cloud Store(Android) 9.4.0.50997 (October 20, 2021; 4 years ago) [±] Puffin TV Browser(Android TV) 9.2.1.50969 (October 18, 2021; 4 years ago) [±] Puffin Secure Browser(macOS) 9.0.1.617 (September 28, 2021; 5 years ago) [±]
- Engine: Blink
- Operating system: Android, iOS, Windows, macOS, Android TV, Linux
- License: Proprietary
- Website: www.puffin.com

Puffin Browser is a remote browser using cloud servers for content processing. Developed by CloudMosa, an American mobile technology company founded in 2009 by Shioupyn Shen, Puffin Browser was initially released in 2010.

It relays the network identity of its users to the websites they visit by adding an extra XFF (X-Forwarded-For) header in each HTTP request containing the user's mobile device's IP address. For websites that do not support the XFF header, Puffin Browser is treated as a proxy server.

Puffin Browser was compatible with Adobe Flash Player, enabling it to play Adobe Flash content, including on mobile devices, where Flash was discontinued due to security issues. Adobe discontinued Flash Player in 2020, and Puffin Browser subsequently dropped its Flash support as well. The browser also features a virtual trackpad, gamepad, and an on-screen keyboard.

Puffin Browser can be used on Android (and formerly iOS); Puffin Secure Browser on Windows and macOS; Puffin Internet Terminal on Linux; Puffin TV Browser on Android TVs, and Puffin OS on mainstream smartphones. Puffin Browser also runs on resource-limited hardware such as Raspberry Pi and set-top boxes.

In May 2019, CloudMosa announced that they would discontinue the Puffin Web Browser app on iOS devices due to Apple's App Store policies. However, CloudMosa released Puffin Web Browser Lite for iOS devices, which does not support Adobe Flash Player.

== History ==
In November 2010 and December 2010, respectively, Puffin Browser released its paid version, Puffin Web Browser Pro, with an increased download limit, on Google Play and the Apple App Store.

In 2013, CloudMosa introduced Puffin Academy, a free mobile browser with built-in Adobe Flash for K-12 students, teachers, and parents. However, the iOS version of Puffin Academy was discontinued on July 1, 2019.

In 2015, Puffin for Facebook was released.

In 2017, the Puffin Browser was the top utility application in the App Store across 58 countries, including France, the United Kingdom, Japan, Italy, and South Korea.

In May 2018, ad–blocking features were added to the Pro version.

In June 2018, CloudMosa announced the release of an independent, lightweight browser app for iOS devices, Puffin Browser Lite, in response to Apple's rejection of updates to Puffin Web Browser. The lightweight browser app is based on iOS WebKit and does not support Adobe Flash Player. CloudMosa later announced that it would discontinue the original Puffin Web Browser apps on all iOS devices on July 1, 2019, because of the block on updates citing Apple's app review guideline 2.5.6. The shutdown was later pushed back to October 1, 2019, and the free version of the original browser app was finally discontinued on November 20, 2019. CloudMosa announced on Facebook that the paid iOS version, Puffin Browser Pro, would remain available but would no longer receive updates.

Puffin TV Browser is an edition of Puffin Browser optimized for Android TV users. It has been ranked the best browser for Android TV by MakeUseOf. Thailand's largest GSM mobile phone operator, Advanced Info Service (AIS), ships a customized version of Puffin TV Browser in their set-top box—AIS Playbox.

Until 2018, the Puffin Browser product family was available only on mobile devices. In June of that year, CloudMosa released a desktop version, Puffin Secure Browser, for Windows (beta in 2017); and in May 2019, a macOS version followed.

By October 2018, Puffin Browser had reached over 50 million users on Android. As of November that year, Puffin Browser had reached 100 million accumulated users worldwide.

In 2019, CloudMosa announced a new member of its Puffin Browser product family, Puffin Internet Terminal, a desktop-virtualization app running on Raspbian for Internet surfing, designed for Raspberry Pi. Puffin Internet Terminal was selected as a CES 2019 Innovation Awards Honoree in the Computer Hardware and Components product category. Later in August 2021, Puffin Internet Terminal was rebranded as Puffin Cloud Learning and released as a demo version that did not require a subscription to support students learning at home during the COVID-19 shelter-in-place.

In May 2019, CloudMosa introduced the Puffin OS, drawing skepticism from the independent review website GSM Arena.

In 2020, the Puffin Android TV browser became a subscription service.

== Products ==
=== Puffin Web Browser ===
Puffin Web Browser is the standard Puffin Browser application for Android and formerly iOS. The Android Puffin web browser supported Adobe Flash content and features such as mouse cursor emulation and a virtual gamepad before being discontinued. Users can choose where to save a downloaded file—either to their devices or directly to their storage drive. The web browser also allows users to reduce data usage from sources such as Flash games, which often consume a lot of data.

=== Puffin Web Browser Lite ===
Puffin Browser Lite is the standard Puffin application for iOS devices. It is similar to the Puffin Web Browser for Android devices, but does not support Adobe Flash Player. It has workspaces and password protection.

== Concerns ==
Because web pages render in the remote browser on Puffin servers, user data passes through them. Some users have concerns regarding the risk of Puffin logging this data. However, Puffin's privacy policy states that it does not log web page content, that it does not have access to users' passwords, and that it is in compliance with GDPR and CCPA.
