= AMSD Ariadna =

- Developer: Advanced Multimedia System Design
- Release: 1995; 31 years ago
- Stable release: 1.3 / 1996; 30 years ago
- Operating system: Windows 95; Windows NT
- Available in: Web browser
- License: Proprietary
- Website: www.amsd.com/projects/ariadna.html

AMSD Ariadna is the first Russian web browser ever developed. It was developed by Advanced Multimedia System Design (AMSD) in early 1994.

== History ==
To spread word of the Internet in Russia, AMSD researched the web browser in 1994. It was released in 1995 and was ported to Windows 95 and Windows NT.

By the time of its introduction, Internet Explorer and Netscape Navigator, two no-cost browsers, were dominating the Russian browser market. Ariadna, however, wasn't free software and, despite its high quality, failed to make a stance in the market and was terminated a few years later.

== Features ==
Being a pioneer browser, Ariadna has limited functionality compared to today's browsers. Some features include:

- Data filter
- HTML 3.2 support
- E-mail and text box support
- PNG support, including transparency (but not as background images)
- Limited Java support (only JDK 1.02)
- 50,000 word English-Russian dictionary

Ariadna does not support animated GIFs or JavaScript.

== See also ==
- List of web browsers
- History of the World Wide Web
