= SearchMe =

Defunct visual web search engine

SearchMe Inc.
- Type: Search engine
- Industry: Internet
- Founded: California, US
- Headquarters: Mountain View, California; San Francisco, California, US
- Key people: Randy Adams (CEO)
- Products: Search
- Website: www.searchme.com

SearchMe was a visual search engine based in Mountain View, California. It organized search results as snapshots of web pages — an interface similar to that of the iPhone's and iTunes's album selection.

In July 2009, the company lost funding and the search engine went offline.

== History ==
=== Founding ===
SearchMe was founded in March 2005 by Randy Adams and John Holland. Adams was inspired to start this search engine when his 5-year-old son was having difficulty reading. He hoped to create a search engine that "would improve the experience of finding information online". Sequoia Capital spent millions of dollars to fund SearchMe during the website's opening years.

In March 2008, the site was launched in beta status. In April 2008, the company launched its search engine on the Internet.

=== Offline in July 2009 ===
The company had 1.8 million visitors in March 2009, but by May of the same year, the number of visitors decreased to 600,000. On July 24, 2009, SearchMe went offline due to financial troubles, such as maintaining the servers.

Of its 45 employees, SearchMe announced in July 2009 it planned to dismiss 35. The company attempted to concentrate on the market of broadband TV.

== Searches ==
As search queries were being made, SearchMe returned categories that were related to the topic. The search engine had Facebook and Twitter links so that the results could be shared. The top of the screen displayed the screenshot, while the bottom revealed the hyperlink and a site's description. Moving the mouse from left to right made the screen "flip in the corresponding direction".

SearchMe's tagline was "You'll know it when you see it." As of March 2008, the website had indexed one billion pages.

=== Revenue ===
It required about 3 million searches every day for the company to "break even". The website received its revenue from advertisements. Advertisements were displayed through screenshots of the products or companies that were being promoted. Search results were ranked through algorithms and the number of views a website had received. Websites that were "visually appealing" were ranked higher than those that were not.

=== Criticism ===
SearchMe had been criticized for not providing the number of search results, causing users to not know whether they were perusing through 10 results or 1,000 results. Some of SearchMe's screenshots were difficult to read, causing users to decide whether a site is relevant based on its appearance. However, the website highlighted the search queries for easier perusal of the screenshot.

== Other services ==
In 2007, SearchMe founded Wikiseek, which indexed Wikipedia pages and sites that were linked to from Wikipedia articles.

In October 2008, SearchMe released a music streaming service, which enabled users to download an unlimited number of songs. The service relied on Imeem's collection of music.
