= IE Tab =

Extension for Mozilla Firefox

- Original author(s): Hong Jen Yee
- Developer(s): Blackfish Software
- Stable release: 14.4.8.1 / April 10, 2021; 3 years ago
- Operating system: Microsoft Windows
- Type: Browser extension
- License: Trialware
- Website: ietab.net

IE Tab is a browser extension for the Google Chrome web browser. The extension allows users to view pages using the Internet Explorer browser engine MSHTML. This can be used for viewing pages that only render properly, or work at all, in Internet Explorer.

== History ==
IE Tab was originally conceived by a Taiwanese medical student, Hong Jen Yee. He first developed the plugin and provided a simple demonstration page; he then released it to the forums of the Taiwanese Mozilla community. Other Taiwan developers created an extension to facilitate the use of the plugin. With some instructions for XPCOM usage from Swiss Mozilla developer Christian Biesinger, the plugin and extension were integrated successfully, forming the prototype of IE Tab. The tool was initially released on mozdev.org and the MozillaZine forum.

The original developer, Hong Jen Yee, abandoned the project in 2006, but subsequent development has been carried on by Blackfish Software since 2009.
