= MarioNet split web browser =

The MarioNet Internet Appliance is an application that runs on a server and sends pre-rendered graphical images to a light-weight client for display.

It was prototyped in January 1999 at iCentrix Ltd in Andover, Hampshire, UK, by former Caldera UK employees led by Roger Alan Gross and Andrew Thomas Wightman.

The concept behind MarioNet was to build a thin-client browser to provide web-based content to very small client platforms with little RAM or ROM and minimal processing power. It was designed to run on a range of embedded operating systems or indeed a ROM platform without an operating system. The server side used Mozilla, the recently open-sourced web browser based on Netscape's Navigator. A proprietary protocol called OPTIC was used to communicate between the two parts.

Target client devices included cell phones, tablet devices, touch screen information kiosks and vending machines.

== Functional overview ==
A unique feature of the MarioNet design was its split architecture. The majority of the browser code resided on a web server where most of the work would be done including HTML processing, image rendering for the target device and the connection to the World Wide Web. The remote controlled client was a small graphics engine which simply uncompressed and displayed images and relayed mouse movements and keystrokes (hence the marionette play on words). This technology is also called a cloud browser.

The design had at its core a light-weight proprietary transport protocol called OPTIC (Optimized Protocol for Transport of Images to Clients). This protocol was very simple and required only a single connection between the client and a server. OPTIC would run over any transport protocol from RS-232 serial communications to Wi-Fi or Bluetooth.

On startup, the client sent the characteristics of the screen (resolution, color depth, physical size etc.) to the server where the images were processed and rendered for the target device. They would then be compressed and sent via the OPTIC protocol to the client for display.

The design of client software was just a few kilobytes of code and was based on Wightman's own tiny ROMable graphical windowing system called GROW (Graphical ROMable Object Windows) which he had developed whilst at Digital Research in the early 1990s.

The server browser based on Mozilla was restructured to incorporate a client-side rendering capability and support for the OPTIC protocol.

== Proof of concept ==
A proof of concept was developed and trialled at Kimpton Primary School in Hampshire, UK. A cyber cafe was created in the school's library comprising a Linux web server appliance and legacy 286 PCs running the client part. The trial generated some interest in the media and received a further boost when Sir George Young MP, attended a demonstration given by Gross at Kimpton School.

Despite early interest, the team struggled to raise the funding required to patent the invention and develop the concept into a commercial product, so iCentrix was dissolved when Gross joined Citrix UK in Cambridge later on in 1999.

The idea languished for several years until the announcement of a similar technology as the Opera Mini in 2005, and Bolt (web browser) in January, 2009, client/server split web browsers with light-weight clients. Later, Amazon announced an Amazon EC2 server based, "server-accelerated", split-architecture browser, Amazon Silk, for Kindle Fire in 2011.

== See also ==
- DR-WebSpyder
