= MediaBrowser =

Web browser branding company

MediaBrowser (MediaBrowser.com, Inc.) was a web browser branding company founded in 2000 by Mark C. Brown. They made specially branded versions of Internet Explorer for various company brands and themes, including Nintendo. On December 5, 2001, the company filed for Chapter 7 bankruptcy and shut down their website and branded web browsers due to company debts of $2.49 million and various unpaid loans.

== Branding ==
The branding consisted of various brand images on the background, navigation buttons, splash screen and links to specific web pages that related to the brand of the company. MediaBrowser also had a space for ads to display at the bottom of the web browser. MediaBrowser's MicroTron was also included in every MediaBrowser branding to display brand-related video content to the user.

== Nintendo browsers ==
Pokémon GS Branded MediaBrowser

In late 2000, Nintendo partnered with MediaBrowser to make branded browsers of their new and upcoming video games. The first two browsers to be released were for the then-upcoming Pokémon Gold and Silver alongside Mario Tennis. CD-ROM copies of the branded Gold and Silver browser were made available as bonuses for anyone who pre-ordered a copy of Pokémon Gold and Silver as a special promotion. Later in 2001, other browsers were released branded with other Nintendo games such as Paper Mario and Legend of Zelda: Majora's Mask. A Nintendo Power branded browser was released as well.

Later in 2001, the custom browsers were delisted from Nintendo's website for unspecified reasons, and the contents of the page were replaced with a message stating that a date for when the browsers would return was unknown alongside asking viewers to check the company's downloads page for updates.

== System requirements ==
MediaBrowser's browsers required at least:

- 486 MHz processor
- Internet Explorer 5.0
- Windows Media Player 6.4
- Macromedia Flash Player 4.0
- RAM: 32MB
- Free disk space: 5MB

The browsers additionally required an active Internet connection, and they were only able to be run normally from Windows versions 95 to XP. Compatibility mode is required to run the browsers in later Windows versions starting with Windows Vista.

Registration on MediaBrowser's website was additionally required before users were able to use the browsers. Due to the closure of MediaBrowser's website, usage of new installations of their browsers has been rendered impossible without modifying a value in Windows' Registry to bypass the registration requirement.
