= Dave Hyatt =

American software engineer and a Shadowrun game expansion author

- Born: 28 June 1972 (age 52)
- Occupation: Software Developer
- Known for: Development on Mozilla, Safari and WebKit; Creating Camino; Co-creating Mozilla Firefox

David Hyatt (born 28 June 1972) is an American software engineer and a Shadowrun game expansion author. Employed by Apple starting in 2002, he was part of the Safari web browser and WebKit framework development team. He also helped develop the HTML 5, XBL, and XUL specifications.

== Computing career ==
Before Apple, Hyatt worked at Netscape Communications from 1997 to 2002 where he contributed to the Mozilla web browser. While at Netscape, he also created Camino (then known as Chimera) and co-created Firefox (originally called Phoenix) with Blake Ross. He is credited with the implementations of tabbed browsing for Chimera and Firefox.

Joining Apple Inc. on 15 July 2002, Hyatt was part of the original development team that shipped the beta releases and 1.0 release of the Safari web browser, and co-developed its underlying WebKit framework.

Hyatt was also one of the lead WHATWG developers of the HTML 5 specifications, being co-editor, with Ian Hickson, of the first public working draft, published by the World Wide Web Consortium (W3C) in January 2008. He resigned from the HTML 5 project in March 2010 to concentrate on other work. Hyatt also created and wrote the first specifications for the XBL and XUL markup languages, and has remained a member of W3C's CSS Working Group.

== Gaming career ==
As a freelance writer, he also co-authored published material for Shadowrun role-playing game, including the expansion packs Renraku Arcology: Shutdown (with Brian Schoner) and Brainscan (chapters "The Return of the Father" and "Runners Ex Machina", with Robert Boyle; volume editor, Brian Schoner). In his spare time, Hyatt developed, but no longer maintains, the software for Shadowland Six a forum for the Shadowrun gaming community.

== Personal life ==
Hyatt studied as an undergraduate at Rice University and graduate at the University of Illinois at Urbana-Champaign.
