= Bolt (web browser) =

BOLT Browser
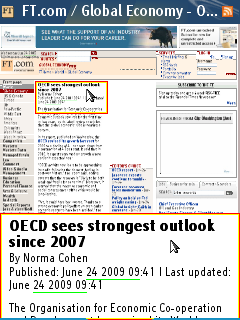
- Screenshot of BOLT Browser v1.04 Beta3
- Developer: Bitstream Inc.
- Initial release: February 16, 2009
- Final release: 2.52 [±]
- Engine: WebKit
- Platform: Java ME
- Available in: English, Spanish, and Russian; can display web pages in languages with Latin or Cyrillic-based alphabets
- Type: Mobile browser
- License: Proprietary

The BOLT Browser was a web browsing system for mobile phones including feature phones and smartphones able to run Java ME applications. The BOLT browser was installed on the phone, and BOLT servers accessed web pages, processed and compressed them, and delivered them to phones running the browser. The BOLT Browser was offered free of charge to consumers, and by license to mobile network operators and handset manufacturers. BOLT was produced by Bitstream Inc., the company which previously produced ThunderHawk for mobile network operators and handset manufacturers. BOLT was originally introduced into private beta on January 15, 2009 and was made available to the public on February 16, 2009 when the public beta was announced at Mobile World Congress in Barcelona. BOLT supported Java-based handsets with Java MIDP 2 and CLDC 1.0 or higher. BOLT also has specially optimized version for BlackBerry smartphones and worked with Windows Mobile and Palm OS devices that employ a MIDlet manager or Java emulator. BOLT was built using the WebKit rendering engine to display a full Web page layout as found on desktop web browsers.

In December 2011, the BOLT proxy server was discontinued, disabling the service, and browser development stopped.

== History ==
- January 15, 2009: BOLT was introduced as a private beta.
- February 16, 2009: BOLT was made available via free public beta at Mobile World Congress.
- April 1, 2009 – BOLT Beta2 was released at CTIA Wireless 2009 in Las Vegas, NV. This release included improvements, fixes to minor bugs and new features.
- June 29, 2009 – BOLT Beta3 released, BOLT lite announced. Beta3 included major improvements, fixes to minor bugs and new features.
- October 7, 2009 - BOLT 1.5 released. First commercial release marks end of beta testing.
- March 23, 2010 - BOLT 2.0 Beta Version announced by the developer Bitstream Inc. The biggest change is the inclusion of tabbed browsing
- May 24, 2010 - BOLT 2.1 Released, introducing support for HTML video

== Milestones ==
- January 16, 2009 - BOLT private beta (ver 0.73) reviewed as the fastest mobile browser.
- March 30, 2009 - BOLT (ver 0.86) reviewed as only browser for feature phones that can stream video.
- May 29, 2009 - 1 in 6 BOLT users resides in India (current version Beta2 0.94).
- June 23, 2009 - BOLT surpasses 1 million end-user installs (current version Beta2 0.94).
- July 28, 2009 - BOLT surpasses more than 100 million Web pages rendered (current version Beta3 1.04).

== Demise ==
On 12 December 2011, Bolt's website changed to display the following message:

Dear BOLT User, 

The free BOLT mobile browsing service has been discontinued. 
Unfortunately, the economic circumstances prevent us from
running a free service going forward. We apologize for any
inconvenience and thank you for your loyalty and support. 

The BOLT Team

The browser displayed a banner indicating that the service would be discontinued on 14 December. From that date the browser no longer functioned.

== Features ==
The distinguishing features of the BOLT browser included split screen rendering, a patented BOLT technology in which a compressed view of the desktop style page layout was visible in the upper two thirds of the screen. A magnification rectangle was available for scrolling over this area. A magnified view of the selected area was displayed in the lower third of the screen. This technology enabled the user to view desktop style layouts of web pages without compromising readability on small screens.

Bolt had several additional features. Tabbed browsing enabled the user to browse more than one site simultaneously. BOLT used cloud-based servers that could compress the data reaching the device (sometimes as much as 24-fold), providing faster page loads and reducing the amount of data transferred; many users paid per megabyte. The proxy servers used by BOLT were located in the United States. BOLT provided a special mode for easing the view of web pages. A split-screen mode featured a rectangular magnifier floating over a zoomed out mini-map of the entire Web page on the top 2/3 of the screen and a magnified view of the content under the magnifier on the bottom 1/3 of the screen. The magnifier floating over the mini-map enabled the user to quickly find information and navigate Web sites with ease.

BOLT enabled the user to back up favorites to the device's memory and restore them back through BOLT directly. Favorites to the user account could be backed up at BOLT Space and restored back regardless of device, its platform, BOLT type (BOLT or BOLT Lite) and location. BOLT supported HTML media based audio and video streaming, and also supported expanded streaming flash video support.

BOLT offered Facebook integration, an ability to post messages, links or URLs from any page displayed in BOLT directly to the Facebook account without navigating away from the currently viewed page. BOLT offered support for Facebook chat and other web-based chat apps. It also provided support for YouTube web apps, enabling the searching and viewing of videos directly in BOLT.

== Technologies ==
The BOLT mobile browser was compatible with the majority of mobile phones. It offered desktop-style web browsing including the ability to stream video.

=== Split-screen view ===
A patented split-screen viewing feature and intuitive keystroke shortcuts made navigating web pages simple. BOLT was built using Bitstream's ThunderHawk mobile browsing technology.

=== WebKit rendering engine ===
BOLT was built using the WebKit rendering engine to deliver the same web page layout as found on desktop browsers and included high standards compliance such as AJAX and flash video support. Bitstream's client/server technology, mobile fonts and font rendering technologies speed content delivery enabled mass market deployments, improved readability and allowing BOLT to fit more information into smaller screens. BOLT's underlying ThunderHawk mobile browsing technology supported both J2ME platforms, as well as non-J2ME environments though a C++ SDK.

The BOLT browser passed the Acid3 test with a perfect 100% score. Acid3 is a test page from the Web Standards Project that tests how well a web browser supports certain web standards.

=== Web technologies ===
- BOLT did not support Flash but it supported the FLV Format (as in streaming video Web sites including www.YouTube.com, www.Myspace.com, video.google.com, etc.).
- BOLT provided ECMA Script 262 version 3 JavaScript support for Web site forms, applications and other information.
- BOLT enabled the viewing of AJAX pages that are written using ECMA-262 version 3/JavaScript 1.6 standard. The Web pages that use timer related events were not supported.
- BOLT supported WAP 1.x content — WML, and WAP 2.x content — XHTML-MP with WCSS and ECMAScript-MP.

== Security and privacy ==
BOLT was signed with third-party certificates from VeriSign and Thawte. These "signatures" enabled the device OS to confirm BOLT's authenticity, provide access to secure device APIs, and help ensure that BOLT was free from malware and/or viruses. Signed applications enable users to use BOLT with fewer permission dialogs for file and network access from their device's OS.

However, a few platforms including Motorola P2K did not allow installation of signed builds. To enable installation on these devices, an unsigned version of BOLT, with no certificate, was also offered.

=== Server proxy ===
BOLT proxied all requests via BOLT cloud servers to compress traffic and maintain site-specific information about users, such as browser cookies and site preferences and the contents of shopping carts. This solution had major security implications: BOLT could trivially track user activity and even arbitrarily tamper with content displayed by the browser.

=== 128-bit secure (SSL) connection ===
BOLT used an encrypted protocol called Secure Sockets Layer (SSL) to access secure Web pages. The connection between the device and the BOLT server was also encrypted.

=== Certificate error notification ===
A certificate is an electronic document that can help identify a Web site's owner and can help you make decisions about trusting the site with personal or financial information. BOLT warned about certificate error when there was a problem with a certificate or the server's use of the certificate.

== Localization and languages ==
BOLT was available in English, Spanish, Russian, and Indic.

BOLT supported viewing Web sites in all Latin-based languages including English, German, French, Spanish, Dutch, Flemish, Swedish, and many others that are fundamentally Latin-based. Using the "Install Fonts" utility, you could also view Web sites in Cyrillic-based languages including Bulgarian, Russian, Belarusian, Serbian, Macedonian, Ukrainian, Moldovan, Kazakh, Uzbek, Kyrgyz, Tajik, Tuvan and Mongolian.

BOLT was also available in the Indic languages.

== Awards ==
The BOLT browser received numerous awards and mentions in the media. Some of the important awards for the BOLT browser are:

- Mobile Merit Awards | 2010 | Runner Up in Overall Consumer Application and Service Delivery Platform categories. The BOLT Mobile Browser was named Runner Up in the 2010 Mobile Merit Awards in two categories: Best Overall Consumer Mobile Application and Best Service Delivery Platform.
- CTIA E-Tech Awards | 2010 | First Place in Mobile Applications – Entertainment/Social Networking Category
- Mobile Star Awards | 2009 | Superstar Award in Consumer App: Web Browser category. BOLT mobile browser took top honors in the eighth annual Mobile Star Awards program, winning the SUPERSTAR award in the Consumer App: Web Browser category. Other nominees in this category included Apple – Safari for iPhone, Opera Mobile and Skyfire.
- Stevie Awards | 2009 | Finalist for Most Innovative Company of the Year
- CNET Webware 100 Award Finalist | 2009 | Finalist Browsing category
- Tech Awards Circle | 2009 | Bronze Award for Best Consumer/SOHO Software
- PC Magazine | December 29, 2009 | 4 star rating (out of 5)

== See also ==
- Opera Mini, a server-based compressing browsing system
- UC Browser, a server-based compressing browsing system
