= Flow (web browser) =

Proprietary web browser

- Developer: Ekioh
- Stable release: None
- Engines: Flow, SpiderMonkey
- Operating system: Windows, macOS, Linux, Android
- Type: Web browser
- License: Proprietary
- Website: ekioh.com/flow-browser

Flow is a web browser with a proprietary browser engine intended for low-power devices or embedded systems, such as the Raspberry Pi.

== History ==
Flow is developed by Ekioh, a company from Cambridge, England, which has made simple browsers for set-top boxes and other embedded systems. The browser was originally created as an SVG browser in 2006, before later adding HTML support and multithreading. The first beta was released in December 2020. As of April 2025, it is still in beta.

In April 2025 it was announced a preview version had reached 90% compliance with Web Platform Tests, meeting one of Apple's criteria for use on iOS – prior to an EU ruling, all iOS browsers had to use the Webkit engine used by Safari.

== Features ==
Flow is intended for use in embedded systems, such as a beta version for the Raspberry Pi. There are no concrete plans to release a version for desktop devices. Flow uses its own proprietary browser engine, along with the SpiderMonkey JavaScript engine from Mozilla. The browser uses multithreading and renders everything using the GPU in order to keep the CPU free for execution. The performance automatically scales as new CPU and GPU cores are added.
