= Floorp =

Free and open-source Japanese web browser based on Firefox

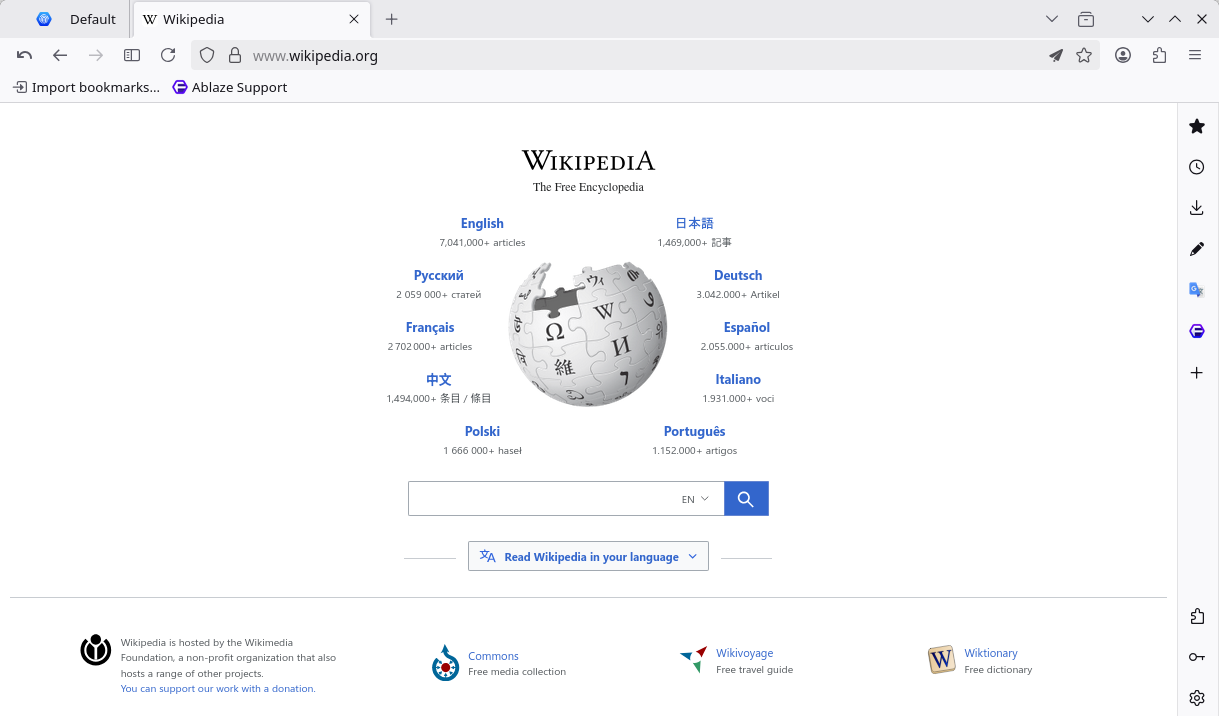
- Floorp 12.1.2 on Linux displaying Wikipedia front page
- Developer: Floorp Projects
- Release: 22 August 2021; 5 years ago
- Stable release: 12.18.1 / 23 September 2026; 5 days ago
- Engine: Gecko, SpiderMonkey
- Operating system: Linux; macOS Catalina and later; Windows 10 and later
- Platform: x86_64, AArch64
- Available in: 23 languages
- Type: Web browser
- License: Mozilla Public License 2.0, Floorp Shared Source License
- Website: floorp.app
- Repository: github.com/Floorp-Projects/Floorp/

Floorp (Note: Katakana: フロープ Furōpu) is a free and open-source Japanese web browser based on Firefox, with an emphasis on UI customization and impute options. Its first version was released on 22 August 2021. There are official releases for Linux, macOS, and Windows. And as of 28 August 2026 there is a mobile version for iOS and iPadOS called Floorp for iOS based on Firefox for iOS currently in beta.

== Features ==
=== Special features ===
- Users can display a QR code for the URL of the current web page.
- Firefox Sync is supported, and can share tabs across devices. It is cross-compatible with most other Firefox derivatives.
- Support for progressive web apps (PWAs) is included.

=== UI and customization ===
Floorp builds on Firefox by adding features including vertical tabs, multi-functional sidebars, and support for custom CSS. It also includes the ability to transfer toolbars to the title bar and to hide the sidebar until the mouse hovers over it. In addition, it supports very detailed customizations, including switching or hiding the bookmark label, moving toolbars to unconventional locations, and having the tab bar and URL bar on the same line. The default theme is "Lepton" but it can be changed to other themes, including previous default "Photon" and operating system-specific themes.

Floorp also includes a mode called "split view", which allows users to view multiple tabs at once without opening a separate window.

=== Privacy ===
Floorp includes several privacy features, including fingerprinting protection, and the ability to disable features such as WebGL and WebRTC. It also disables telemetry from Mozilla, while still including Firefox's anti-tracking features.

Floorp also includes "share mode", which allows users to share their screens while hiding the bookmark bar and sidebar.

== Version history ==
The first version of Floorp was released on 22 August 2021 and was based on Chromium. It was exclusively for developers. The first public version, 7.0.0, released on 19 September, now based on Firefox and with some new features.

Version 8.2.3, released on 2 January 2022, was the first to support English.

Support for themes with custom CSS was added in version 8.7.2, released on 21 April 2022.

With version 10.0.0, Floorp began using Firefox ESR as a base rather than the rapid release version.

Version 11.0.0, released on 29 July 2023, was another major update, adding several customization-related features and reworking several existing features.

With version 12.1.0, released on 19 August 2025, Floorp switched back to using the standard rapid release version of Firefox as a base. This came with many added and changed features.

Version 12.11.0, released on 13 March 2026, added the ability to install Chrome extensions.

== Reception ==
Japanese technology magazine Mr.PC praised the browser for being convenient and easy to use, and for including useful extensions by default.

And Jared Newman of Fast Company criticized Floorp for not being friendly to beginners, a lack of DRM support on certain websites, and the lack of a mobile version. The lack of DRM support was resolved with version 12.1.0, released on 19 August 2025, which switched back to using the standard rapid release version of Firefox as a base.

== See also ==
- Firefox
- Midori (web browser)
