= Servo (software) =

Experimental browser engine

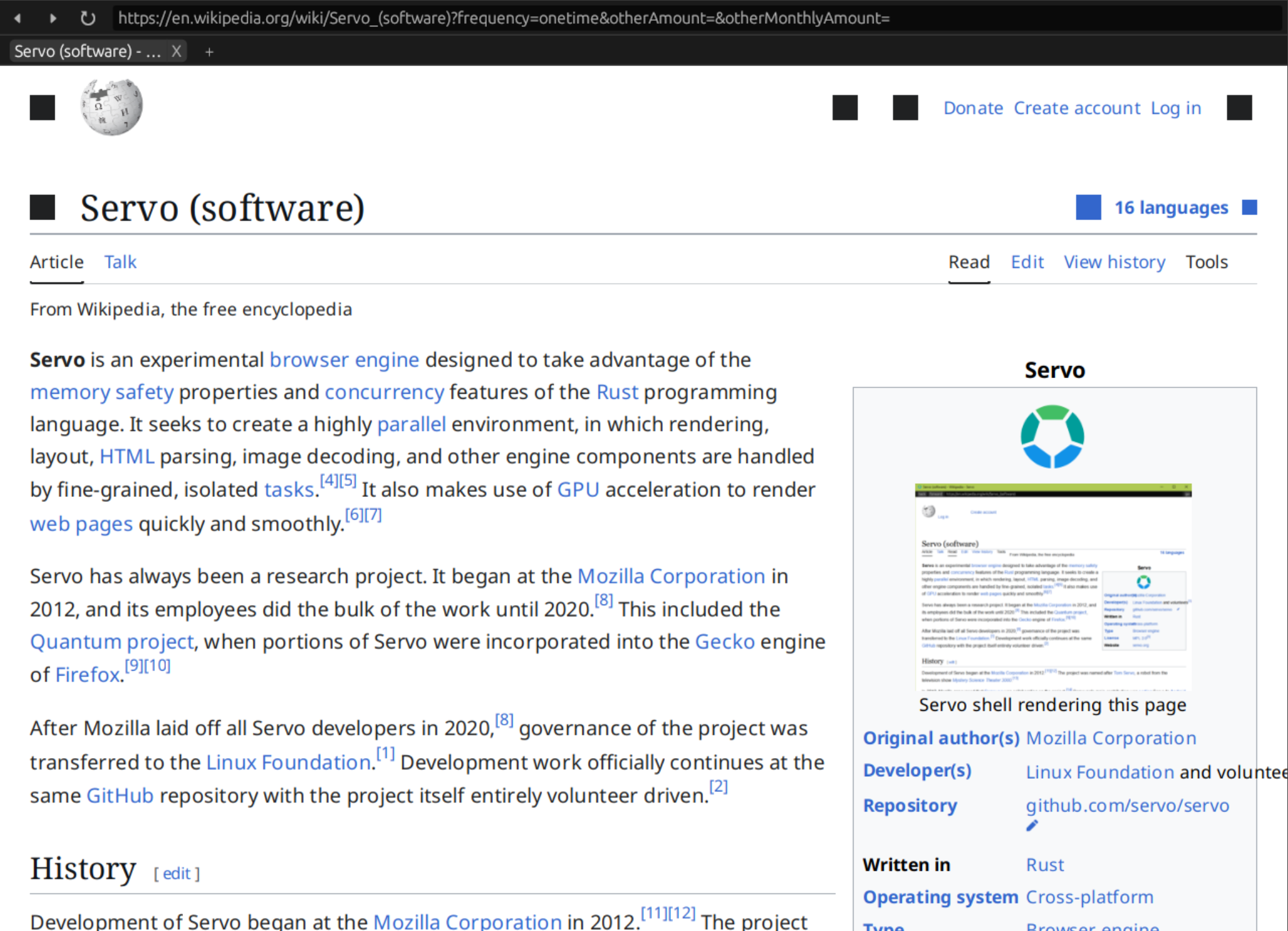
- Servo shell rendering this page
- Original author: Mozilla Corporation
- Developers: Linux Foundation Europe and volunteers
- Stable release: 0.4.0 / 31 July 2026; 2 days ago
- Written in: Rust
- Operating system: Windows, Linux, macOS, Android, OpenHarmony
- Type: Browser engine
- License: MPL 2.0
- Website: servo.org
- Repository: github.com/servo/servo

Servo is an experimental browser engine designed to take advantage of the memory safety properties and concurrency features of the Rust programming language. It seeks to create a highly parallel environment, in which rendering, layout, HTML parsing, image decoding, and other engine components are handled by fine-grained, isolated tasks. It also makes use of GPU acceleration to render web pages quickly and smoothly.

Servo has always been a research project. It began at the Mozilla Corporation in 2012, and its employees did the bulk of the work until 2020. This included the Quantum project, when portions of Servo were incorporated into the Gecko engine of Firefox.

After Mozilla laid off all Servo developers in 2020, governance of the project was transferred to Linux Foundation Europe. Development work officially continues at the same GitHub repository with the project itself developed by Igalia and other community members.

== History ==
Development of Servo began at the Mozilla Corporation in 2012. The project was named after Tom Servo, a robot from the television show Mystery Science Theater 3000.

In 2013, Mozilla announced that Samsung was collaborating on the project. Samsung's main contribution was porting Servo to Android and ARM processors. A Samsung developer also attempted to re-implement the Chromium Embedded Framework API in Servo, but it never reached fruition and the code was eventually removed.

The Acid2 test was passed in 2014, and Servo could render some websites faster than the Gecko engine of Firefox. By 2016, the engine had been further optimized. The same year, Mozilla began the Quantum project, which incorporated stable portions of Servo into Gecko.

Servo was the engine of two augmented reality browsers. The first was for a Magic Leap headset in 2018. Then the Firefox Reality browser was released in 2020.

In August 2020, Mozilla laid off many employees, including the Servo team, to "adapt its finances to a post-COVID-19 world and re-focus the organization on new commercial services". Governance of the Servo project was thus transferred to Linux Foundation Europe.

In October 2021, the European Eclipse Foundation launched Oniro, a vendor-neutral open-source distributed operating system for Internet of things and embedded devices, with various partners such as Huawei and Linaro among others. It is based on OpenAtom Foundation's OpenHarmony for software development, and it uses the Servo web engine as part of the open source project, built on Rust language. Experimental support for OpenHarmony was introduced to Servo in July 2024.

In January 2023, the Servo project announced that new external funding had enabled a team of developers to reactivate the project. The initial roadmap focused on selecting one of the two existing layout engines for further development, followed by working towards basic CSS2 conformance. In February 2024, at FOSDEM 2024, the Servo Project team outlined their plans for a 'reboot' of Servo.

On 20 October 2025, Servo v0.0.1 was released, featuring support for Apple silicon devices.
