= Swiftfox =

Discontinued web browser based on Mozilla Firefox

- Developer: Jason Halme
- Final release: 3.6.13 [±]
- Preview release: 4.0.0 [±]
- Operating system: Linux
- Type: Web browser
- License: binaries: proprietary source: MPL 1.1
- Website: www.getswiftfox.com (archived)

Swiftfox was a web browser based on Mozilla Firefox. It was available for Linux platforms and distributed by Jason Halme. Swiftfox was a set of builds of Firefox optimized for different Intel and AMD microprocessors. Swiftfox was freely downloadable with open source code and proprietary binaries. Firefox extensions and plugins were compatible with Swiftfox, with notable exceptions. The name Swiftfox comes from the animal swift fox. Swiftfox differs from Firefox by a limited number of changes, and builds for different processors. Swiftfox was discontinued at some point prior to April 2017, and the project homepage now redirects to the creator's private Twitter account.

== Optimization ==
The Swiftfox build is optimized using the following methods:

Binary code optimization

- Compiled with the highest level of compiler optimization, rather than optimization for binary size.
  - Swiftfox is compiled -O3, (the highest level)
    - The resulting Swiftfox binary is larger than Firefox. (-O3 is not necessarily faster than -O2, or -Os. -O3 introduces two more options on top of -O2: -finline-functions and -frename-registers. The latter is good for CPUs with many registers but may actually be slower on other CPUs.)
  - Firefox is compiled -Os. (-Os is the same as -O2 but removes optimizations which would increase the binary size.)
- Binaries incorporate additional instruction sets.
  - Intel and AMD: MMX, SSE, SSE2, (not generally SSE3).
  - AMD only: 3DNow!
- Optimization specific to the build microprocessor architecture.
  - Intel: Pentium 4, Pentium 3, Pentium M, Pentium III, Pentium II, Pentium 4 (Prescott).
  - AMD64: Athlon64 (32bit binary).
  - AMD: Athlon XP, Athlon, K6-2.
- Compiled with newer version of GCC (Firefox 2.0 uses 3.3.2, Swiftfox 2.0 uses 4.0.4).

Increased security

- Better protection from buffer overflow attacks (Swiftfox 2.0 uses -D_FORTIFY_SOURCE=2; Firefox 2.0 uses gcc 3.x, which does not support this).

Simplify

- Pango is not included in the build. This means that Unicode fonts remain supported (see Unicode and HTML), but without certain extra features provided by Pango. This simplification reduces the binary size, and reduces rendering.

Changed default preference values

- IPv6 DNS lookups are disabled. preventing slowdowns experienced
- HTTP pipelining is enabled by default. Fasterfox provides a GUI to adjust these settings.
- For full details, see .

== Swiftfox speed ==
No definitive benchmarking has been reported, but a quicker startup time and a 1.7% webpage rendering speedup has been reported on version 1.5.0.6. There are no benchmarks for the different processors builds.

== Additional options ==
Swiftfox is bundled with the following freely available Firefox plugins and extensions:

- XForms extension is installed and enabled
- libunixprintplugin.so plugin is installed

== License ==
The same as Firefox, the Swiftfox source code is open-source, with the source code under MPL 1.1 except for parts relating to branding. Unlike Firefox, the Swiftfox binaries have a proprietary license which does not allow redistribution. According to the author, this is to prevent the possibility of any confusion with tainted versions (see the Firefox branding argument Mozilla Firefox#Trademark and logo). The name Swiftfox is trademarked by Jason Halme, and accordingly cannot be used on other third party Firefox builds without his permission.

=== Debian ===
Swiftfox binaries are available as Debian packages from official site. The proprietary binary license prevents Debian and other Linux distributions from having Swiftfox available as part of a distribution, so to redistribute Swiftfox one would have to change the name and icons.

== See also ==
- Firefox
