= AT&T Pogo =

Web browser

Pogo Browser

- Developers: AT&T and Vizible
- Type: Web browser

AT&T Pogo was a Mozilla Firefox based web browser developed by AT&T and Vizible. A private beta was released to a limited number of users, but the project was terminated when Vizible sold its intellectual property to Open Text.

== Features ==
Features that were present in the private beta release included:

- Ability to create multiple home pages.
- Visual tab pages displaying a thumbnail for each open page.
- Visual method for managing Internet bookmarks.
- Visual method for viewing and managing internet history.
- Search feature for finding bookmarks and history items.
