= Comodo Internet Security =

Internet security software suite

- Comodo Internet Security version 10 Premium on Windows 10
- Developer: Comodo Group
- Stable release: 12.3.3.8152 / October 31, 2024; 17 months ago
- Operating system: Windows 7 and later; OS X 10.9 and later; Ubuntu, Debian, Fedora, RHEL, Mint, CentOS, OpenSUSE, SLES
- Platform: IA-32 and x64
- Type: Antivirus, personal firewall
- License: Freemium
- Website: antivirus.comodo.com

Comodo Internet Security (CIS) is developed and distributed by Comodo Group, a freemium Internet security suite that includes an antivirus program, personal firewall, sandbox, host-based intrusion prevention system (HIPS) and website filtering.

== Version history ==
=== Release 5 ===
In CIS 5.0 cloud antivirus protection and spyware scanning capabilities were added. As it could not clean all the malware it found effectively, Comodo Cleaning Essentials was developed to supplement CIS.

Host-based intrusion prevention system: Comodo's host-based intrusion prevention system (HIPS), named Defense+, is designed to provide protection against unknown malware. It is designed to restrict the actions of unknown applications, and restrict access to important files, folders, settings and the Windows Registry. Defense+ by default refuses any unknown program to install or execute except when specifically allowed by the user or when the file appears on Comodo's whitelist. In CIS 4.0 a sandbox was added to Defense+ to isolate and run unknown applications.

=== Release 6 ===
CIS v6, released February 2013, provided a major revision of the user interface and significant new features such as a fully sandboxed desktop environment.

=== Release 7 ===
On 6 March 2014, Comodo announced completion of beta testing for CIS v7. Release 7 became official in April 2014. This release includes a new virus monitoring tool called VirusScope and Web Filtering features that provide control over user access to web content.

=== Release 8 ===
Became official on 3 November 2014. It includes enhanced auto-sandboxing features.

=== Release 10 ===
Became official on 22 December 2016. It includes Secure Shopping, prevention on malware intercepting during online transactions.

=== Release 11 ===
Became official on 26 June 2018. It includes many stability and performance changes.

=== Release 12 ===
Became official on 26 March 2019. It includes extra functionality in creating rules and full support for Windows 10 October 2018 update.

== Comodo Endpoint Security Manager (CESM) ==
Comodo Endpoint Security Manager (CESM) is a discontinued server product for centrally managing the security settings and security components of network endpoint computers. CESM manages the distribution and updates of antivirus and firewall software.

The antivirus and firewall software managed by CESM are versions of the same software used by the consumer versions of Comodo Internet Security.

== Reception ==
=== Reviews ===
PC Magazine lead security analyst, Neil J. Rubenking, reviewed Comodo Firewall Pro 3.0 and Comodo Internet Security 3.5 on 3 November 2008, giving 4.5 out of 5 to the first and 2.5 to the second. He praised the suite's firewall capabilities but criticized its antimalware capabilities. On 28 May 2009, Roboert Vamosi of PC World reviewed Comodo Internet Security 3.8 and gave it a score of 1 out of 5, criticizing it for its "disappointing malware detection" based on AV-TEST result and "limited feature set".

Three years and three version later, Comodo Antivirus results became significantly better. On 30 January 2012, Rubenking reviewed Comodo Internet Security 2012 Pro (v5.0), giving it 4 stars out of 5. He praised its support service and antimalware features but was panned for its "effectively off by default" firewall, Defense+ popups, lack of parental control, antispam, antiphishing, and privacy protection features, and finally, "Low ratings from independent labs".

In a 9 January 2013 review, Techworld awarded Comodo Internet Security Pro 2013 4 of 5 stars and concluded "Cloud-based scanning and behaviour analysis joins a suite of top-notch security tools, designed to keep your PC secure. Recommended." Also on the same date, Mike Williams of BetaNews.com reviewed Comodo Internet Security Pro 2013 and concluded "The program remains too complex for total PC beginners, we suspect. The average user will appreciate its largely automatic operation, though, while experts enjoy the powerful tools and extreme configurability."

On 7 February 2013, Comodo Internet Security Complete v6 earned the PC Magazine Editor's Choice award. Reviewing the software again, Neil J. Reubenking gave it a score 4.5 of 5 stars, commended its support service, VPN solution, Comodo Secure DNS service and value for price but criticized its behavior blocker and its poor anti-phishing capabilities. Reubenking concluded "The biggest win for Comodo Internet Security Complete 2013 isn't in features, but in support. The GeekBuddy service fixes any problem, security or otherwise, using remote assistance. A Virus-Free Guarantee reimburses you for damage if malware gets past Comodo; you can also get reimbursed for expenses related to identity theft. Add a GeekBuddy-powered tuneup tool and an unusually powerful backup utility and you've got a winner."

Once again, PC Magazine lead security analyst, Neil J. Rubenking, reviewed Comodo Internet Security in 2019 with very poor performance.

=== Independent test labs ===
AV-TEST, an anti-virus test lab based in Germany, tested Comodo. Products that surpass the industry standard (measured by the mean score of the participating products) are awarded a certificate. Comodo Internet Security participated in their tests since 2010, and for the first time in February 2013, Comodo Internet Security Premium version 6.0 obtained the AV-TEST certificate in the field of home products.

On 18 January 2013, Matousec, an independent tester of security software, analyzed 38 security products for their proactive defense capabilities and ranked Comodo Internet Security 2013 Premium (v6) number one. Comodo Internet Security 2013 was tested on Windows 7 SP1 with Internet Explorer 9 and passed 101 out of 110 tests (92%). It was also ranked number 1 in 2012.

== See also ==
- Internet Security
