= List of pop-up blocking software =

This is a list of software that can block pop-up ads. Blocking is usually a user-enabled option, and can in many cases allow specified exceptions.

== Browsers that can block pop-up ads ==
Trident shells

- AOL Explorer
- GreenBrowser
- Internet Explorer
- Lunascape
- Maxthon
- MSN Explorer
- NeoPlanet
- Netcaptor
- Netscape 8
- Sleipnir

Gecko-based browsers

- Camino
- Epiphany
- Flock
- Galeon
- K-Meleon
- Lunascape
- Mozilla Application Suite
- Mozilla Firefox
- Netscape 7
- Netscape 8
- SeaMonkey

KHTML/WebKit-based browsers

- Avast Secure Browser
- Brave
- Google Chrome
- iCab
- Konqueror
- Lunascape
- OmniWeb
- Safari
- Shiira
- Vivaldi

Presto-based browsers

- Opera

Others

- Links
- NetSurf
- w3m

== Add-on programs that block pop-up ads ==
- uBlock Origin
