= Microsoft Corp. v European Commission =

Legal case

Microsoft v. Commission
- Court of First Instance

Submitted 7 June 2004 Decided 17 September 2007
- Full case name: Microsoft Corporation v. Commission of the European Communities
- Case: T-201/04
- CelexID: 62004A0201
- Case type: Action for annulment, Appeal against penalty
- Chamber: Grand chamber
- Nationality of parties: United States

Court composition
- President; Bo Vesterdorf

Microsoft Corp. v Commission of the European Communities (2007; T-201/04) is a case brought by the European Commission of the European Union (EU) against Microsoft for abuse of its dominant position in the market (according to competition law). It started as a complaint from Sun Microsystems over Microsoft's licensing practices in 1993, and eventually resulted in the EU ordering Microsoft to divulge certain information about its server products and release a version of Microsoft Windows without Windows Media Player. The European Commission especially focused on the interoperability issue.

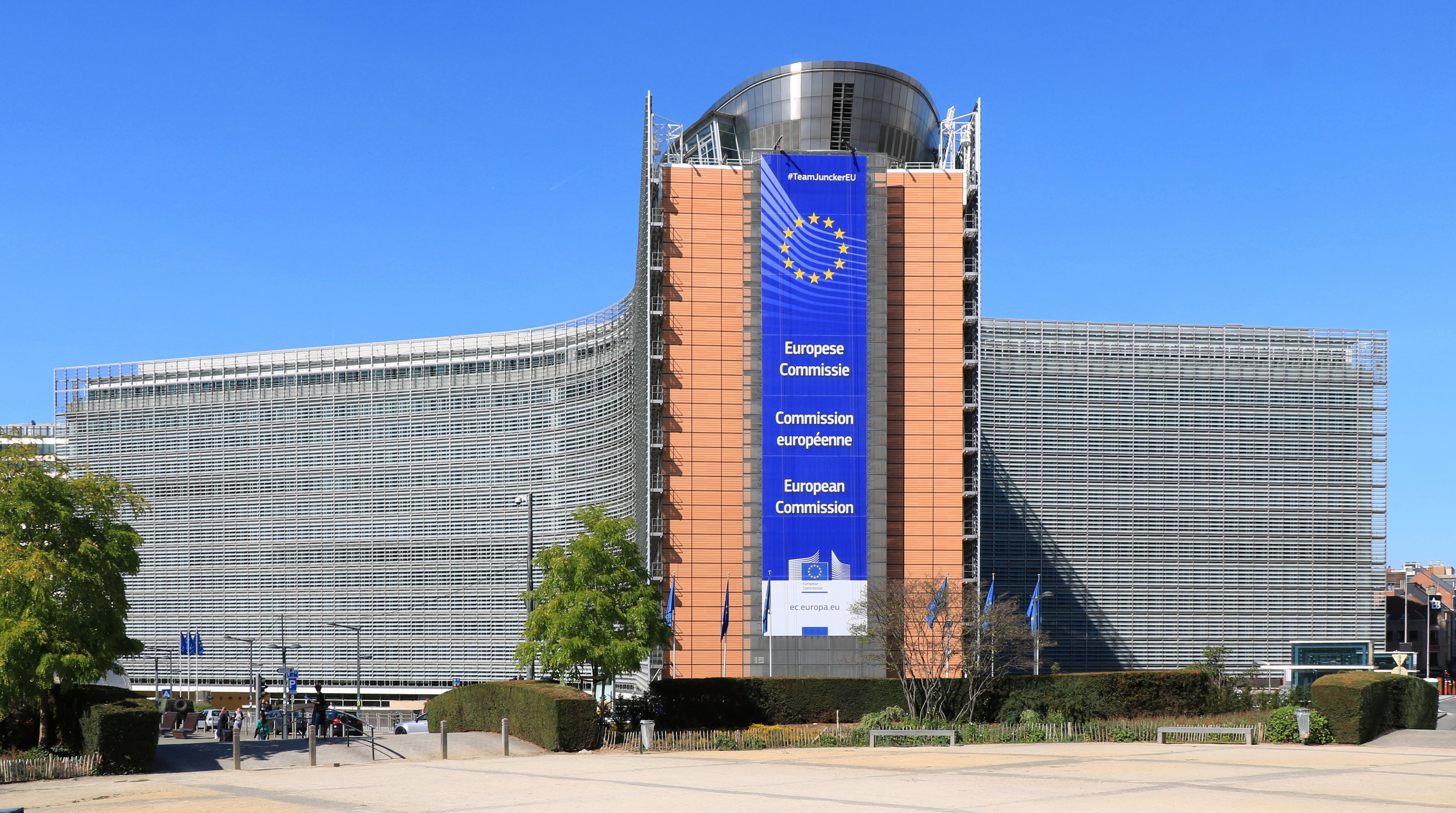
Headquarters of the European Commission, which has imposed several fines on Microsoft

== Facts ==
In 1993, the American software company Novell claimed that Microsoft was blocking its competitors out of the market through anti-competitive practices. The complaint centered on the license practices at the time which required royalties from each computer sold by a supplier of Microsoft's operating system, whether or not the unit actually contained the Windows operating system. Microsoft reached a settlement in 1994, ending some of its license practices, specifically "charging royalties on a 'per processor' basis", which allowed Microsoft to be paid without providing a product and caused systems bundling other software (such as Novell's DOS 7.0) to be more expensive due to the alternative system software incurring an extra cost on top of the Microsoft licensing fee. Additionally, Microsoft agreed to stop requiring that software developers sign non-disclosure agreements preventing them from developing applications simultaneously for Microsoft and non-Microsoft platforms.

In 1998, Sun Microsystems raised a complaint about the lack of disclosure of some of the interfaces to Windows NT. The case widened when the EU examined how streaming media technologies were integrated with Windows.

== Judgment ==
Citing ongoing abuse by Microsoft, the EU reached a preliminary decision in the case in 2003 and ordered the company to offer both a version of Windows without Windows Media Player and the information necessary for competing networking software to interact fully with Windows desktops and servers. In March 2004, the EU ordered Microsoft to pay €497 million ($794 million or £381 million), the largest fine ever handed out by the EU at the time, in addition to the previous penalties, which included 120 days to divulge the server information and 90 days to produce a version of Windows without Windows Media Player.

The next month Microsoft released a paper containing scathing commentary on the ruling including: "The commission is seeking to make new law that will have an adverse impact on intellectual property rights and the ability of dominant firms to innovate." Microsoft paid the fine in full in July 2004.

In 2004, Neelie Kroes was appointed the European Commissioner for Competition; one of her first tasks was to oversee the fining brought onto Microsoft. Kroes has stated she believes open standards and open source are preferable to anything proprietary:

The Commission must do its part ... It must not rely on one vendor, it must not accept closed standards, and it must refuse to become locked into a particular technology – jeopardizing maintenance of full control over the information in its possession

== Significance ==
Microsoft has a compliant version of its flagship operating system without Windows Media Player available under the negotiated name "Windows XP N". In response to the server information requirement, Microsoft released the source code, but not the specifications, to Windows Server 2003 Service Pack 1 (SP1) to members of its Work Group Server Protocol Program (WSPP) on the day of the original deadline. Microsoft also appealed the case, and the EU had a week-long hearing over it. Neelie Kroes stated:

Microsoft has claimed that its obligations in the decision are not clear, or that the obligations have changed. I cannot accept this characterization—Microsoft's obligations are clearly outlined in the 2004 decision and have remained constant since then. Indeed, the monitoring trustee appointed in October 2005, from a shortlist put forward by Microsoft, believes that the decision clearly outlines what Microsoft is required to do. I must say that I find it difficult to imagine that a company like Microsoft does not understand the principles of how to document protocols in order to achieve interoperability.

Microsoft stated in June 2006 that it had begun to provide the EU with the requested information, but according to the BBC the EU stated that it was too late.

On 12 July 2006, the EU fined Microsoft for an additional €280.5 million (US$448.58 million), €1.5 million (US$2.39 million) per day from 16 December 2005 to 20 June 2006. The EU threatened to increase the fine to €3 million ($4.81 million) per day on 31 July 2006 if Microsoft did not comply by then.

The second scenario, where the Commission concludes that a behavior by a firm is not abusive (but it is), the firm is left alone to its own devices and to its anti-competitive practices, which may affect the competition process and cause irreparable damages, and ultimately the consumers are harmed. As a result of the law being under-inclusive, the firms get away with their anti-competitive practices. This is known as a 'false negative', and the European Union Competition Commission is more concerned with this, and it would rather interfere than step back. The US court's fear of false positives was seen in the case of Verizon Communications Inc. v. Law Offices of Curtis V. Trinko, LLP (2004) which was about refusal to supply. The US Supreme Court stated that it had to include a realistic comparison between the costs and the benefits of antitrust intervention. It stated that mistaken conclusions and false condemnations are very costly and that they negate the purpose which antitrust laws are designed to protect. In the EU, the case relevance is IMS Health GmbH & Co. OHG v NDC Health GmbH & CO. kg, in which the Court of Justice laid down limited conditions under which a dominant firm's refusal to license IP to a competitor constitutes an abuse of a dominant position in violation of Article 82 of the Treaty establishing the European Community (now Article 102 TFEU).

The main concern raised in Microsoft v Commission was whether two distinct products were a subject of a tie. Tying is a specific type of exclusionary abuse which refers to the situation where customers that purchase one product (the tying product) are also required to purchase another product from the dominant undertaking (the tied product). This is intended to provide the customers with better products in the most cost-effective ways. However, an undertaking which is dominant in one product market can harm consumer benefit through tying by foreclosing the market for other products. The commission's findings showed that Microsoft had tied its Windows Media Player to its personal computer operating system. There was serious evidence to point out that Microsoft advertised Windows Media Player as a standalone product to be downloaded by itself, it was designed to work with competitors' operating systems, and there was a separate licensing agreement for the media player. Alden F. Abbott (U.S. Federal Trade Commission), while visiting the Center for Competition Law and Policy at the University of Oxford, in his paper on "A Brief comparison of European and American Antitrust Law" talked about the early intervention of the European enforcers in regard to bundling/tying practices which conforms to the idea about the European Union and its concern for false negatives. He states that bundling carried out by a dominant firm is likely to be found more concerning by the EU than the American enforcers. Neelie Kroes, the then Commissioner for EU Competition Policy, stated that Microsoft had continued to abuse its powerful market position and hindering innovation by charging extraordinary royalties to companies for providing crucial data to computer users around the world. She also goes on to state that main aim of the competition policy is to avoid consumer harm and to produce consumer benefits. However, the Assistant Attorney General at that time for Antitrust, R. Hewitt Pate issued a statement on the EC's decision in its Microsoft investigation. He commented that the US antitrust laws are enforced to protect the consumers by protecting the competition, not competitors. The commission's guidance on Article 102 states that the commission will normally only intervene where the conduct concerned has already been or is capable of hampering competition from competitors which are considered to be as efficient as the dominant undertaking. The commission is mindful that what really matters is protecting an effective competition process and not simply protecting competitors. This may well mean that competitors who deliver less to consumers in terms of price, choice, quality and innovation will leave the market. With regards to tying of Windows Media Player, the commission found out that customers were unable to buy Windows without WMP, and they install any alternative software alongside WMP. Microsoft argues that customers need not use it and that they did not have to pay extra for it. Microsoft argues that tying of WMP allowed the consumers to have their personal computers running with default options, out of the box, which lowered the transaction cost by reducing time and confusion.

The decision highlighted that tying in this particular case would result in foreclosing the competition in this market. There was evidence that even though the other media players were rated higher in quality, WMP's usage increased due to the tying process. The commission ordered that Microsoft should sell in Europe a full functioning version of Windows without WMP. It also asked Microsoft to refrain from promoting WMP over competitors through Windows or providing selective access to Windows APIs. Microsoft was also restricted from giving discounts to customers who were buying the operating system together with WMP, which would restrict the user's choice to select the version without the player, and the unbundled version had to have similar performance with the bundled version. Richard Whish in his textbook goes on to say that the way in which Article 102 has been construed, has led academic commentators to compare it with ordoliberalism, which is capable of having negative effects on the competition process, but disagrees by stating that at the heart of Article 102, the main objectives of the EU Commission are competition, efficiency, and welfare.

On 17 September 2007, Microsoft lost their appeal against the European Commission's case. The €497 million fine was upheld, as were the requirements regarding server interoperability information and bundling of Media Player. In addition, Microsoft has to pay 80% of the legal costs of the Commission, while the commission has to pay 20% of the legal costs of Microsoft. However, the appeal court rejected the Commission ruling that an independent monitoring trustee should have unlimited access to internal company organization in the future. On 22 October 2007, Microsoft announced that it would comply and not appeal the decision any more, and Microsoft did not appeal within the required two months as of 17 November 2007.

Microsoft announced that it will demand 0.4% of the revenue (rather than 5.95%) in patent-licensing royalties, only from commercial vendors of interoperable software and promised not to seek patent royalties from individual open source developers. The interoperability information alone is available for a one-time fee of €10,000 (US$15,992).

On 27 February 2008, the EU fined Microsoft an additional €899 million (US$1.44 billion) for failure to comply with the March 2004 antitrust decision. This represented the largest penalty ever imposed in 50 years of EU competition policy until 2009, when the European Commission fined Intel €1.06 billion ($1.45 billion) for anti-competitive behaviour. This latest decision follows a prior €280.5 million fine for non-compliance, covering the period from 21 June 2006 until 21 October 2007. On 9 May 2008, Microsoft lodged an appeal in the European Court of First Instance seeking to overturn the €899 million fine, officially stating that it intended to use the action as a "constructive effort to seek clarity from the court".

In its 2008 Annual Report, Microsoft stated:

The European Commission closely scrutinizes the design of high-volume Microsoft products and the terms on which we make certain technologies used in these products, such as file formats, programming interfaces, and protocols, available to other companies. In 2004, the Commission ordered us to create new versions of Windows that do not include certain multimedia technologies and to provide our competitors with specifications for how to implement certain proprietary Windows communications protocols in their own products. The Commission’s impact on product design may limit our ability to innovate in Windows or other products in the future, diminish the developer appeal of the Windows platform, and increase our product development costs. The availability of licenses related to protocols and file formats may enable competitors to develop software products that better mimic the functionality of our own products which could result in decreased sales of our products.

On 27 June 2012, the General Court upheld the fine, but reduced it from €899 million to €860 million. The difference was due to a "miscalculation" by the European Commission. The commission's decision to fine Microsoft was not challenged by the court, saying the company had blocked fair access to its markets. E.U. competition commissioner Joaquín Almunia has said that such fines may not be effective in preventing anti-competitive behavior and that the commission now preferred to seek settlements that restrict businesses' plans instead. As such, The New York Times called the Microsoft decision "a decision that could mark the end of an era in antitrust law in which regulators used big fines to bring technology giants to heel."

A spokesperson for Microsoft said the company was "disappointed with the court's ruling" and felt the company had "resolved [the commission's] competition law concerns" in 2009, making the fine unnecessary. He declined to say whether Microsoft would file an appeal or not. Almunia called the ruling a vindication of the crackdown on Microsoft and warned "The judgment confirms that the imposition of such penalty payments remains an important tool at the commission’s disposal." He also claimed that the Commission's actions against Microsoft had allowed "a range of innovative products that would otherwise not have seen the light of day" to reach the market.

The fines will not be distributed to the companies that lost income due to Microsoft practices. The money paid in fines to the European Court goes back into the EU budget.

=== Related investigations ===
In May 2008, the EU announced it was going to investigate Microsoft Office's OpenDocument format support.

In January 2009, the European Commission announced it would investigate the bundling of Internet Explorer with Windows operating systems from Microsoft, saying "Microsoft's tying of Internet Explorer to the Windows operating system harms competition between web browsers, undermines product innovation and ultimately reduces consumer choice." In response, Microsoft announced that it would not bundle Internet Explorer with Windows 7 E, the version of Windows 7 to be sold in Europe.

On 16 December 2009, the European Union agreed to allow competing browsers, with Microsoft providing a "ballot box" screen letting users choose one of twelve popular products listed in random order. The twelve browsers were Avant, Chrome, Firefox, Flock, GreenBrowser, Internet Explorer, K-Meleon, Maxthon, Opera, Safari, Sleipnir, and Slim, which were accessible via BrowserChoice.eu. The automatic nature of the BrowserChoice.eu feature was dropped in Windows 7 Service Pack 1 in February 2011 and remained absent for 14 months despite Microsoft reporting that it was still present, subsequently described by Microsoft as a "technical error". As a result, in March 2013 the European Commission fined Microsoft €561 million to deter companies from reneging on settlement promises.
