= BrowserChoice.eu =

Website created by Microsoft in March 2010

- Screenshot of browser choice screen initially showing five leading browsers in a random order. The user can scroll across the page to reveal some more possible browsers in another random order.
- Dissolved: January 2015
- Area served: European Union
- Creator: Microsoft
- Products: Web browsers
- Website: browserchoice.eu at the Wayback Machine (archived 2014-02-20)
- Registration: None
- Launched: 2010
- Current status: Defunct

BrowserChoice.eu was a website created by Microsoft in March 2010 with links to various web browsers. The Microsoft Corp. v. European Commission legal case proceeding argued that Microsoft created a dominant position in the browser market by including Internet Explorer with their market-dominant Windows operating system.

Microsoft's legal obligation to display the website expired in December 2014. It was discontinued on December 18, 2014, stating only "[visit] the websites of web browser vendors directly", before going offline during 2015.

== Content ==
The web browser choice screen, also known as the web browser ballot box, was a screen displayed in Internet Explorer that offered ten to twelve browsers in a random order. The screen was presented only to Windows users whose default web browser was Internet Explorer. It affected the European Economic Area, Croatia, the United Kingdom, and Switzerland. A patch was made available via Windows Update to provide the screen to users. It was distributed under the Microsoft Knowledge Base ID number 976002; after the website was discontinued in December 2014, the update was removed from Microsoft Update Catalog.

The browser choice screen listed 10 to 12 browsers in random order; the top tier of five were immediately visible and the remaining ones could be seen by scrolling the list. The order of the browsers on the page was initially planned to be alphabetical, but after criticism a random system was used with two groups.

The first group included the five most used browsers ‒ Internet Explorer, Mozilla Firefox, Google Chrome, Opera, and initially Safari but later Maxthon ‒ representing the four major rendering engines (Trident, Gecko, Blink and WebKit). The second group contained less well-known browsers, also in random order: at different times this group included Avant Browser, Comodo Dragon, Flock, GreenBrowser, K-Meleon, Lunascape, Maxthon, Rockmelt, SRWare Iron, Sleipnir, and SlimBrowser.

=== Revisions ===
The initial March 2010 list had Internet Explorer, Firefox, Chrome, Opera and Safari in the first tier, with Avant Browser, Flock, GreenBrowser, K-Meleon, Maxthon, Sleipnir and SlimBrowser in the second tier. In August 2010 Microsoft removed GreenBrowser and Sleipnir from the choices, replacing them with Lunascape and SRWare Iron. In November 2011 Microsoft reduced the number of second tier browsers from the previous seven to six. They removed Flock and SlimBrowser, but re-established Sleipnir.

In February 2012 Microsoft increased the number of second tier browsers to seven: Comodo Dragon and Rockmelt were added, while Sleipnir was removed again. In August 2012 Microsoft removed Apple Safari from the first tier due to the browser's discontinuation on Windows, and replaced it with Maxthon. SlimBrowser was added back to the second tier. In February 2013 Microsoft removed SlimBrowser from the second tier and replaced it with Sleipnir.

In May 2013 Microsoft removed Rockmelt from the second tier. By May 2014 Microsoft had removed Comodo Dragon from the second tier. In September 2014 Comodo was returned to the second tier, replacing Avant Browser. In December 2014 the website was discontinued.

List of revisions
Date	First tier	Second tier	Archived page
March 2010	Internet Explorer, Firefox, Chrome, Opera, Safari	Avant Browser, Flock, GreenBrowser, K-Meleon, Maxthon, Sleipnir, SlimBrowser	
August 2010	Internet Explorer, Firefox, Chrome, Opera, Safari	Avant Browser, Flock, K-Meleon, Maxthon, SlimBrowser, Lunascape, SRWare Iron	
November 2011	Internet Explorer, Firefox, Chrome, Opera, Safari	Avant Browser, K-Meleon, Maxthon, Lunascape, SRWare Iron, Sleipnir	
February 2012	Internet Explorer, Firefox, Chrome, Opera, Safari	Avant Browser, K-Meleon, Maxthon, Lunascape, SRWare Iron, Comodo Dragon, Rockmelt	
August 2012	Internet Explorer, Firefox, Chrome, Opera, Maxthon	Avant Browser, K-Meleon, Lunascape, SRWare Iron, Comodo Dragon, Rockmelt, SlimBrowser	
February 2013	Internet Explorer, Firefox, Chrome, Opera, Maxthon	Avant Browser, K-Meleon, Lunascape, SRWare Iron, Comodo Dragon, Rockmelt, Sleipnir	
May 2013	Internet Explorer, Firefox, Chrome, Opera, Maxthon	Avant Browser, K-Meleon, Lunascape, SRWare Iron, Comodo Dragon, Sleipnir	
May 2014	Internet Explorer, Firefox, Chrome, Opera, Maxthon	Avant Browser, K-Meleon, Lunascape, SRWare Iron, Sleipnir	
September 2014	Internet Explorer, Firefox, Chrome, Opera, Maxthon	K-Meleon, Lunascape, SRWare Iron, Comodo Dragon, Sleipnir	

== Results ==
Competing browsers saw their traffic increase, suggesting that these smaller competing developers were gaining users. However, long-term trends show browsers such as Opera and Firefox losing market share in Europe, calling into question the usefulness of the browser choice screen.

== Criticism ==
The order of the browsers on screen was at first insufficiently random, which led to uneven distribution. This was later fixed by Microsoft.

At the time of its inception, half of the suggested browsers used Internet Explorer's Trident rendering engine, thus users who choose web browsers other than Internet Explorer for the intention of avoiding it might still end up using IE's layout engine. This had resulted in criticism amongst the web development community even though Microsoft was adhering to the court agreement's methodology.

Opera Software complained that the ballot screen could not be reached in some cases because of the start configuration screens of IE. In 2012 Microsoft had issues with both Windows 7 and Windows 8 no longer leading new users in the European Union to the page. The Windows 7 SP1 retail release was initially missing BrowserChoice.eu functionality, affecting 28 million computers. The error remained unpatched for 14 months, and as a result in March 2013 the European Commission fined Microsoft €561 million. Windows 8 was also released without the browser choice screen functionality and patched several days after the release. Mozilla's general counsel estimated that 6–9 million downloads of Firefox web browser alone were lost due to the mistake.

Makers of the second-tier browsers Flock, Avant, GreenBrowser, Maxthon, Sleipnir, and Slim sent a petition to the EU to get Microsoft to add text or a graphic (rather than just the slider) indicating that there are more than five browsers. Microsoft responded by stating: "We (Microsoft) do not plan on making any changes at this time."

== See also ==
- European Union Microsoft competition case
- United States v. Microsoft Corp.
- Criticism of Microsoft
- Microsoft litigation
