= MOTD =

MOTD may refer to:

- Match of the Day, the BBC's main football television programme
  - Match of the Day (American TV series), NBCSN soccer television program based on the above
- Match of the Day (novel), a Doctor Who novel
- Message of the day, a message shown to computer users when they log in
- "Mothers of the Disappeared", a song by rock band U2

== See also ==
- Mothers of the Plaza de Mayo, sometimes called Mothers of the Disappeared
