= Fenrir (disambiguation) =

Fenrir, Fenrisulfr, or Fenris is a Norse mythological wolf. It may also refer to:

- Fenrir (moon), a moon of Saturn named after Fenrisulfr
- Fenris, designation of a battlemech in the science-fiction series BattleTech
- Fenrir, a monster card in the Yu-Gi-Oh! Trading Card Game
- Fenris, homeworld of the Space Wolves Space Marine chapter in the Warhammer 40,000 universe
- Fenrir Inc, Japanese developer of the Sleipnir web browser
- Fenris Glacier, a glacier in eastern Greenland

== Printed media ==
- Fenrir, a journal released by the Order of Nine Angles
- Fenris Ulf, or Maugrim, a character in The Lion, the Witch, and the Wardrobe
- Fenrir Greyback, a werewolf in the Harry Potter series
- The Lord of Terror (Oh My Goddess!), from the anime series Oh My Goddess!
- Fenris, a character in the comic series Lucifer
- Fenris Wolf (Marvel Comics), a comics character based on the Norse wolf
- Fenris (comics), the name of two characters and a terrorist organization in the Marvel Comics universe
- The Fenris Device, a novel/weapon in the Hooded Swan
- Fenris, the varg's God in the book The Sight

== Video games ==
- Fenrir, a squadron in the Ace Combat series
- Fenrir, a military corporation in Danganronpa
- Fenrir, a boss in Etrian Odyssey Untold: The Millennium Girl
- Fenrir, a Minmatar freighter in Eve Online
- Fenrir, the name of Cloud Strife's motorcycle in the Final Fantasy VII series
- Fenrir, a defending operator in Tom Clancy's Rainbow Six Siege
- Fenrir, an Omnigear in Xenogears
- Fenris, a character in Dragon Age II
- GTC Fenris-class cruiser in the FreeSpace series
- Fenris, a character in Quest for Glory
- The Fenris Brood, a faction in StarCraft
- Get of Fenris, a werewolf tribe in Werewolf: The Apocalypse

== See also ==
- Fenriz, the stage name of Norwegian musician Leif Nagell
