= Traveller's Inn =

Canadian hotel chain

Traveller's Inn is the largest hotel chain in Victoria, BC, Canada. The chain has ten properties located in downtown Victoria and two additional properties; one of located just outside the downtown core of Victoria and the other located in the Cowichan Valley. The latter two are represented as Traveller's International Grand Resorts under the names Mountainside Luxury Resort and the Oceanfront Grand Resort respectively.

== History ==
In 1997, company founder and CEO John Asfar purchased, renovated, managed and franchised the first Traveller's Inn location. Today, a total of one hotel in Victoria and has been upgraded, renovated and repositioned as Traveller's Inn Hotels with their trademark blue signs. Canada Select, the national rating program for accommodations, have ratings for the various Traveller's Inn locations fluctuating between 3 and 3.5 stars out of five. However, they are also cited as being relatively inexpensive; in keeping with the slogan “Making Victoria Affordable,” the accommodations are geared towards affordable travel for both business and pleasure. The company has also been awarded the #1 Hotel Value 7 years in a row (as of 2006) by Victoria News.

Traveller's Hotels in Victoria, BC went into receivership or bankruptcy in 2009. This bundled with John Asfar's email to the Victoria Times Colonist newspaper stating that he was going to sell all his possessions and go to Africa and look after all the unfortunates there doesn't bode well for the chain. The company is being operated by the bankruptcy receivers as they assess the asset value versus debt, as stated by CBC News, Sympatico.ca News, and Yahoo Canada News. The company group owes over $60 million as claimed by creditors.

On December 10, 2009, the location at 626 Gorge Rd East is expected to come under new ownership. Tim Quocksister of Victoria and a business partner are buying 626 Gorge Rd. East for $1.376 million. December 14, 2009, will see the new owners meeting with both Victoria's mayor and an official from the Burnside Gorge Community Association to discuss the building's use,

626 Gorge was sold just prior to Asfar apparently applying for a 6-month extension of his repayment date for the locations.

1961 Douglas Traveller's Inn City Center was sold to the owner of the Red Lion, Wally Eng. The hotel is undergoing renovations but was still open for business under Captial City Center Hotel before closing prior to 2025.

The abandonded 704 Discovery St location burnt down October 24th 2026.

== Associated partnerships and services ==
Traveller's Inn has a program in place known as Stay Miles, wherein hotel guests can bank reward points during their time at any Traveller's Inn. These points can be earned and redeemed at any Traveller's Inn location, similar to the redemption system of Air Miles.

Traveller's Inn also owns the local Victoria company TI Executive Limousine. The company has a fleet of Lincoln stretch limousines, Lincoln Navigator SUVs and limousine buses. The company operates basic limo services and offers tours of local wineries.

== Services ==
Traveller's Inn Stay Miles is a loyalty program set up for frequent patrons of the hotel franchise. Customers earn "points" for each stay at a Traveller's Inn location which can be later redeemed in exchange for a variety of goods and services of non-monetary designation.
