= Bread Financial =

American financial company

Bread Financial Holdings, Inc.
- Formerly: Alliance Data Systems Corporation (1996–2022)
- Type: Public
- Traded as: NYSE: BFH; S&P 600 component
- Industry: financial services
- Founded: April 22, 1983; 43 years ago
- Headquarters: Columbus, Ohio, U.S.
- Area served: United States
- Key people: Ralph Andretta (president & CEO)
- Products: Credit cards
- Revenue: ▼US$3.84 billion (2024)
- Operating income: ▼US$381 million (2024)
- Net income: ▼US$277 million (2024)
- Total assets: ▼US$22.9 billion (2024)
- Total equity: ▲US$3.05 billion (2024)
- Number of employees: 6,000 (2024)
- Subsidiaries: Comenity Bank; Comenity Capital Bank
- Website: breadfinancial.com

Bread Financial Holdings, Inc. is an American publicly traded provider of private label credit cards, coalition loyalty programs, and direct marketing, derived from the capture and analysis of transaction-rich data.

A significant portion of Bread Financial's revenue is generated through late fees charged to the subprime consumers it primarily serves. In October 2024 the Wall Street Journal reported that Bread Financial would raise its soft interest rate of 29.99% and add additional fees to customer accounts in anticipation of a Consumer Financial Protection Bureau ruling that would reduce its $41.00 late payment fee to $8.00.

== History ==
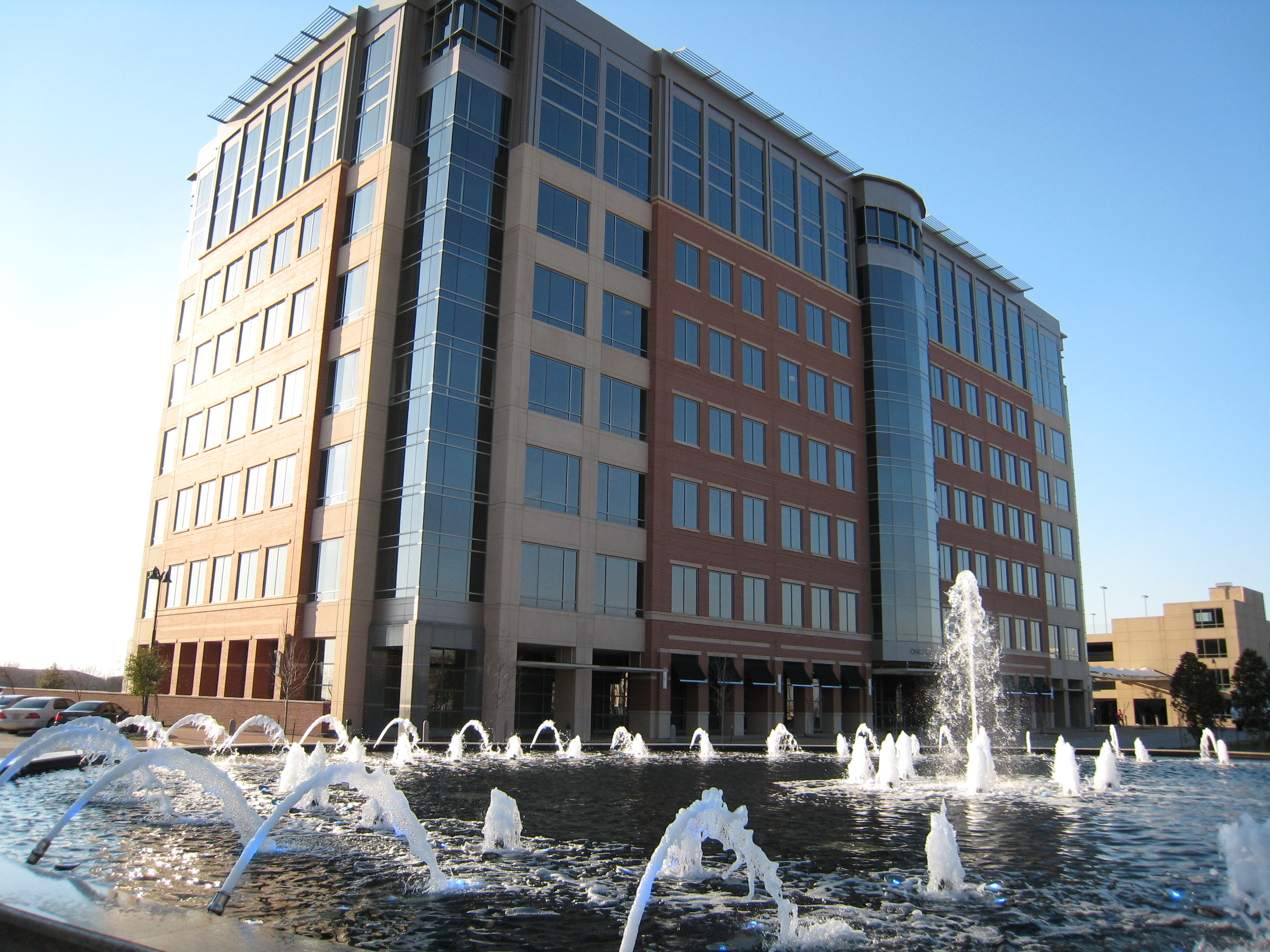
Former headquarters in Plano, TX

Alliance Data was formed from the December 1996 merger of two entities: J.C. Penney's credit card processing unit and The Limited's credit card bank operation, named World Financial Network National Bank.

In August 1998, Alliance Data acquired LoyaltyOne, then-branded The Loyalty Group Canada, for $250 million. The deal gave Alliance Data two business enhancements, Canada's Air Miles Rewards Program and the company behind the Air Miles program, LoyaltyOne.

In 2001, Alliance Data went public.

In May 2007, The Blackstone Group, a private equity firm, announced plans to acquire Alliance Data. In April 2008, Alliance Data terminated the merger agreement with Blackstone Affiliates.

In 2019, Alliance Data opened its first international office in Bangalore, India.

In November 2021, Alliance Data completed the separation of its LoyaltyOne segment, consisting of the Canadian AIR MILES Reward Program and Netherlands-based BrandLoyalty businesses, into an independent, publicly traded company, Loyalty Ventures Inc. In March 2022, Alliance Data rebranded as Bread Financial.

== Former businesses ==
=== Alliance Data Card Services ===
Card Services is a provider of integrated credit and marketing services including private label, co-branded and commercial credit card programs. Alliance Data Card Services manages over 135 card programs for retail brands such as Victoria's Secret, J.Crew, Eddie Bauer, Buckle, HSN, Pottery Barn, Pier 1 Imports, Lexus, Toyota, Williams Sonoma and Wayfair among many others.

Alliance Data Card Services maintains two banks to manage the funding and receivables for its clients' credit programs. In September 2012, the banks rebranded their names from WFNNB (World Financial Network [National] Bank) and WFCB (World Financial Capital Bank) to both operate under the Comenity name, as Comenity Bank and Comenity Capital Bank, respectively.

=== LoyaltyOne ===
LoyaltyOne, located in Toronto, Canada, provides loyalty marketing programs for North American brands in the retail, financial services, grocery, petroleum, travel, and hospitality industries.

Five businesses make up the LoyaltyOne: Air Miles national reward program, in which approximately two-thirds of Canadian households participate; Colloquy; LoyaltyOne Consulting; Precima; and Squareknot.

=== Epsilon (aka Epsilon Data Management) ===
Epsilon provides a broad range of loyalty marketing services spanning database marketing, direct mail, email marketing, web development, loyalty programs, analytics, data services, strategic consulting, and creative services, among others. It sends billions of permission-based emails every year. Acquired by Epsilon in 2011, Aspen Marketing Services is a marketing services agency headquartered in Chicago, Illinois. In 2012, Epsilon acquired the Hyper Marketing ("HMI") group of companies, the largest privately held digital marketing services agencies in the United States, for about $460 million.

In late February 2013, Facebook announced partnerships with four companies, including Epsilon, to help reshape its targeted advertising strategy.

The company relocated its headquarters to the former Nokia regional headquarters space in Las Colinas, Texas, near Dallas.

In April 2019, Publicis Groupe announced it would be acquiring Epsilon for $4.4 billion. This was the second biggest deal in the history of advertising, behind only Dentsu's $5 billion acquisition of Aegis Group in 2012.

On January 27, 2021, the U.S. Department of Justice entered a Deferred Prosecution Agreement with Epsilon Data Management, which set up a $127.5 million fund to compensate victims.

== Controversy ==
In 2010, Epsilon failed to heed warnings to secure data. In March 2011 it was discovered that email addresses from customers of at least 50 client companies were stolen. A phishing tactic that uses personalized emails to trick people into disclosing personal information, including passwords and financial details, it was reported that the breach was related to Epsilon itself being phished. The company quickly notified the public about the breach. In June 2011, company executives were called before Congress to answer questions about the security breach. Interviewed for a 60 Minutes segment titled "The Data Brokers: Selling your personal information", then-CEO and chairman Bryan Kennedy called the hearings "political theater" and stated that "consumers ought to understand that the Internet is an advertising medium."

== Products and Technology ==
In October 2020, Alliance Data launched Enhanced Digital Suite.

In October 2020, Alliance Data selected Fiserv for Credit Processing Services.

In 2021, Alliance Data invested $100M in digital technologies.

In April 2022, Bread Financial partnered with American Express and launched the Bread Cashback American Express Credit Card.

== Company acquisitions and divestitures ==
- 1998: LoyaltyOne was acquired by Alliance Data.
- 2002: Colloquy/Frequency Marketing was acquired by Alliance Data.
- 2004: Epsilon was acquired by Alliance Data.
- 2005: Bigfoot Interactive was acquired by Alliance Data.
- 2006: Abacus was acquired by Alliance Data's Epsilon from DoubleClick.
- 2008: Heartland Payment Systems acquired Alliance Data's Network Services business.
- 2008: Vertex acquired Alliance Data's Utility Services business.
- 2011: Aspen Marketing Services was acquired by Alliance Data (to be a part of Epsilon).
- 2012: Alliance Data acquired the $475 million private label credit card portfolio of The Bon-Ton Stores, Inc.
- 2012: Epsilon acquires Hyper Marketing and agencies Ryan Partnership & Catapult.
- 2014: AD acquired Conversant Formerly known as ValueClick; Conversant specialized in the affiliate marketing business, which revolved around video and mobile channels.
- 2014: Alliance Data acquires BrandLoyalty.
- 2014: Epsilon acquires Conversant, formerly ValueClick.
- 2019: Alliance Data sells off Epsilon to Publicis for $4.4B.
- 2019: Alliance Data acquired Lon Operations Inc., a digital payments company operating under the trademark Bread.
- 2020: Alliance Data closes Bread deal in December.
