= SRWare Iron =

Chromium-based web browser developed by SRWare

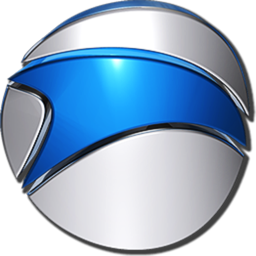

- Iron 135.0.6850.0 on Windows 10
- Developer(s): SRWare
- Initial release: 18 September 2008; 16 years ago

Stable release(s)
- Android: 120.0.6100.0 / 27 January 2024
- Linux: 131.0.6650.1 / 3 January 2025
- macOS: 131.0.6650.1 / 4 January 2025
- Windows: 131.0.6650.1 / 30 December 2024
- Engine: Blink, V8
- Operating system: Windows 7 and later, OS X 10.9 and later, Linux, Android 4.1 and later
- Size: 74.1 MB (Windows), 110 MB (Android)
- Type: Web browser
- Licence: BSD, with some parts under other licences. Source code not provided.
- Website: www.srware.net/en/software_srware_iron.php

SRWare Iron is a Chromium-based web browser developed by the German company SRWare. It primarily aims to eliminate usage tracking and other privacy-compromising functionality that the Google Chrome browser includes. Iron ships with certain Chromium privacy options switched on by default, it provides some additional features that distinguish it from Google Chrome.

== Development history ==
Iron was first released as a beta version on 18 September 2008, 16 days after Google Chrome's initial release.

On 26 May 2009 a Preview-Release (Pre-Alpha) of Iron came out for Linux. And on 7 January 2010 a beta version for macOS was released.

On 11 August 2010, Microsoft updated the BrowserChoice.eu website in order to include Iron as one of the possible choices.

More recent versions of Iron have been released since then, which has gained the features of the underlying Chromium codebase, including Google Chrome theme support, a user agent switcher, an extension system, integrated Adblocker and improved Linux support. Support for Windows XP ended with version 50, but all older versions are still available. With version 55.0.2900, control of WebRTC is taken over by an add-on. Therefore, the "WebRTC disabled" builds are no longer available.

== Differences from Chrome ==
The following Google Chrome features are not present in Iron:

- RLZ identifier, an encoded string sent together with all queries to Google.
- Google Search access on startup for users with Google as default search.
- Google-hosted error pages when a server is not present.
- Google Updater automatic installation.
- DNS pre-fetching, because it could potentially be used by spammers.
- Automatic address bar search suggestions.
- Opt-in sending of both browser usage statistics and crash information to Google.
- Google Native Client.

Added features include:

- An ad blocker.
- A user agent switcher.
- Opt-in blocking of other background communications, such as extension, GPU blacklist, and certificate revocation updates.
- Increased number of recent page thumbnails shown on the New Tab page.

== Criticism ==
In December 2014, Lifehacker said that Iron offers little that is not available by simply configuring Google Chrome's privacy settings. However, the_simple_computer wrote that Iron removes the Google Native Client, Google's custom navigation and error pages and other similar features.

In October 2014, the_simple_computer wrote that even though SRWare Iron released under the BSD licence, the latest source code publicly available at the time was incomplete and for version 6, even though the binaries were on version 14; source code was moved to RapidShare in 2013, with external access blocked, effectively making the program "entirely closed source". In the same year, Lifehacker wrote that SRWare had not released the browser's source code for years. In 2015, SRWare temporarily resumed releasing the source code for the browser.

== See also ==
- Comodo Dragon
- Citrio
- Comparison of web browsers
- List of web browsers
