= Al DiGuido =

- Born: Alexander DiGuido; June 27, 1956 (age 70)
- Occupations: CEO of ZetaInteractive.com, Inc.

Alexander “Al” DiGuido (born June 27, 1956) is an American businessman. He was CEO of direct marketing company Zeta Interactive. Prior to his position with Zeta, DiGuido was the CEO of Epsilon Interactive, another direct marketing company, DiGuido was CEO of Bigfoot Interactive, CEO of Expression Engines, EVP at Ziff Davis, and publisher of Computer Shopper, where he launched ComputerShopper.com, a direct-to-consumer e-commerce engine. Prior to Ziff Davis, he was VP/advertising director for Sports Inc. DiGuido is on the Direct Marketing Association's Ethics Policy Committee.

DiGuido was CEO of Zeta Interactive Corporation from October 2007 to December 2011. He received a bachelor's degree in political science from St. Francis College in Brooklyn, New York. DiGuido has appeared on Fox Business Channel as well as other news outlets on the topic of the digital marketing industry and new technology.

DiGuido is founder and president of Al's Angels, an organization whose primary mission is to actively support existing charitable programs that provide assistance to children and families suffering hardships relating to life-threatening illnesses or conditions.
