= Bigfoot International =

American marketing company

- Type: Holding company
- Industry: Internet, Software, & Digital marketing
- Founded: 1997
- Founder: Lenny Barshack; Jim Hoffman
- Defunct: 2000
- Fate: Divided and sold-off
- Headquarters: New York City
- Products: Web directory, email, web browser, CRM, email marketing

Bigfoot International, Inc. was a New York City based holding company, which developed email communications, marketing automation, and customer interaction software products during the dot-com era. Founded in 1997 by Lenny Barshack and James Hoffman, it grew out of Bigfoot.com, a free e-mail provider and Web directory. It eventually developed into a group of three subsidiaries: Bigfoot.com, Bigfoot Interactive, and Neoplanet, Inc. The company ended in 2000.

== History ==
Bigfoot morphed into a holding company in 1997, when Acxiom Corporation decided to make about $11 million investment to develop E-Mail Campaign Management (ECM) service after a successful implementation of Acxiom Preferred Mail joint service. New York City-based Bigfoot Interactive was formed to develop ECM solutions.

In 1999, Bigfoot International spun out its NeoPlanet division into NeoPlanet, Inc., headquartered in Phoenix, Arizona. Since then, the company became more of a Web incubator type.

Following the dot-com collapse, the company was divided and sold off.

== Bigfoot.com ==
Bigfoot.com started out in 1995 when a former Wall Street executive Lenny Barshack and international PC retailer Jim Hoffman partnered to create an email directory. They secured about $3 million in the first and second rounds of investment from various investors including Sam Zell, Herb Allen and Peter Angelos. There was just one competitor on the market at that time, sled.com, later purchased by Yahoo!.

Bigfoot, which then operated as Bigfoot Partners L.P., continued to develop the service by adding white pages directory and free email service. They soon discovered that email addresses quickly became outdated as users changed their ISPs and jobs. In June 1996 they launched ad-supported "Bigfoot for life", an email forwarding service, which redirected all emails to user's current email.

In 1997, Bigfoot added several paid extra features like email archiving, spam filtering, an auto-reminder that alerts the user on important dates, an auto-responder that replies to mail when the user is inactive and Bigfoot Consolidator, which forwarded emails from multiple accounts into a single mailbox. In January 1998, Bigfoot PermaWeb, a free URL redirection service was added. Bigfoot.com partnered with BellSouth, Hotmail, McAfee and Microsoft among others.

In 1999, Bigfoot International started talks to sell Bigfoot.com. In 2000, it was bought by internet entrepreneur Michael Gleissner. Gleissner has grown the organization into a large international company focused on film and fashion primarily in Asia called Bigfoot Entertainment. Bigfoot email and Bigfoot directories were served by Bigfoot Communications until end of service for "Bigfoot for Life" in 2016.

== Bigfoot Interactive ==
Email direct marketing service Bigfoot Interactive concentrated on ROI-focused email communications technology and permission-based opt-in mailings. Its clients included Eddie Bauer, IBM, 3Com, Washingtonpost.Newsweek Interactive, and Omaha Steaks among others.

In 2000, Bigfoot Interactive entered Japanese market with Bigfoot Japan Corp. funded by Nissho Iwai subsidiary GLQ Entrepia.

In 2001, Bigfoot Interactive merged with Expression Engines, e-mail services and technology provider. A new holding company operated in New York as Bigfoot Interactive with Fred Wilson serving as chairman of the board, Al DiGuido as CEO and Jim Hoffman as CSO.

In 2005, Bigfoot Interactive was acquired by Epsilon, an Alliance Data subsidiary, for a reported $120 million.

== NeoPlanet, Inc. ==
Bigfoot International launched its portal-like browser NeoPlanet in 1997. In January 1999, company decided to spin out its NeoPlanet division.

NeoPlanet, Inc. started out in Phoenix, Arizona with $18 million in venture capital from Network Associates Venture Fund, Bear Stearns, and Venture Frogs. One of NeoPlanet's main focus was providing its customizable browser to the third parties pioneering the branded browsers niche. Universal Studios, Interscope/Geffen/A&M Records, USA Networks, MTV, Lord of the Rings, TV Guide, Hewlett Packard, Carolina Hurricanes, and Phoenix Coyotes launched NeoPlanet's branded browsers among others.

In the spring 2000, NeoPlanet moved its headquarters to Tempe, Arizona. It then raised $23 million from Integral Capital, J & W Seligman, Constellation Ventures, Broadview, and several other investors during the second round of funding.

Following the dot-com collapse, NeoPlanet started its shift from branded browsers to developing and licensing customer relationship management (CRM) software in attempt to gain profitability. Warren Adelman, who previously served as vice president of business development at Bigfoot International, replaced Drew Cohen at CEO position.

In August 2001, NeoPlanet released its Viassary suite designed to personalize PC usersˈ experience and to help companies to better understand and communicate with their customers. Compaq, HP, and Microsoft were among its clients.
