= Baidu Browser =

Web browser developed by Baidu

- Initial release: July 2011
- Operating system: Windows; Android
- Website: liulanqi.baidu.com

Baidu Browser (Chinese: 百度浏览器) is a WebKit and Trident web browser developed by the Chinese software company Baidu for personal computers and mobile phones. The Windows version of Baidu Browser contains a feature for proxy requests to certain websites, which permits access to some websites that are normally blocked in China. It also leaks search terms, hard drive serial number, network MAC address, as well as the title of all visited webpages. GPU model number is also transmitted. It had a built in ad-blocker, and also a torrent and video downloader. The PC edition was discontinued in May 2019, and on 29 September 2019 the basic functions, e.g. webpage browsing were terminated.

== Privacy and security issues ==
In February 2016, concerns were raised regarding the privacy and security of the Baidu Browser. A report from Citizen Lab highlighted potential vulnerabilities, indicating that the browser could expose users to risks related to data privacy. The findings suggested that Baidu Browser may collect sensitive user information without adequate transparency, prompting discussions about the need for improved security measures and user consent in data handling practices.
