= Trident (software) =

Web browser engine by Microsoft first introduced in 1997

- Other names: MSHTML
- Developer: Microsoft
- Release: August 1997; 28 years ago
- Final release: 8.0
- Written in: C++
- Operating system: Microsoft Windows
- Successor: EdgeHTML
- Type: Browser engine
- License: Proprietary
- Website: docs.microsoft.com/en-us/previous-versions/windows/internet-explorer/ie-developer/platform-apis/aa741317(v=vs.85)

Trident (also known as MSHTML) is a proprietary browser engine for the Microsoft Windows version of Internet Explorer, developed by Microsoft.

MSHTML debuted with the release of Internet Explorer 4 in 1997. For versions 7 and 8 of Internet Explorer, Microsoft made significant changes to MSHTML's layout capabilities to improve compliance with Web standards and add support for new technologies.

MSHTML will continue to receive security updates for the IE mode of Microsoft Edge until at least 2029. However, support for new Web standards will not be added.

== Use in software development ==
MSHTML was designed as a software component to allow software developers to easily add web browsing functionality to their own applications. It presents a COM interface for accessing and editing web pages in any COM-supported environment, like C++ and .NET. For instance, a web browser control can be added to a C++ program and MSHTML can then be used to access the page currently displayed in the web browser and retrieve element values. Events from the web browser control can also be captured. MSHTML functionality becomes available by linking the file mshtml.dll to the software project.

== Release history ==
MSHTML version	MSHTML.dll version	Internet Explorer version	Internet Explorer Mobile version	Notes
No version	4.0.x	4.0	—N/a	Initial version.
No version	5.0.x	5.0	—N/a	Improved CSS 1 support and had sweeping changes in CSS 2 rendering.
No version	5.5.x	5.5	—N/a	Corrected issues with CSS handling.
No version	6.0.x	6.0	—N/a	Corrected the box model and added quirks mode with DTD switching.
No version	7.0.x	7.0	—N/a	Fixed many CSS rendering issues and added partial PNG alpha support.
No version	—N/a	—N/a	6.0	IEMobile 6 combines many features of IE 6, 7, and 8.
3.1	7.0	—N/a	7.0	Second port on a mobile system of MSHTML. IE Mobile version for Windows Phone 7.
4.0	8.0.x	8.0	—N/a	First version to pass the Acid 2 test. Added full support for CSS 2.1.
5.0	9.0.x	9.0	9.0	Added support for SVG, XHTML, HTML5, and CSS 3. Added a new hardware-accelerated JScript engine named Chakra. Scores 100/100 on the Acid3 test. Included with IE 9 Mobile in Windows Phone 7.5 "Mango".
6.0	10.0.x	10.0	10.0	More support for CSS 3, HTML5 and ES5. Included in Windows Phone 8. Support for linear gradient CSS transitions.
7.0	11.0.x	11.0	11.0	Support for WebGL and SPDY. Improved support for HTML5. Speed improvement. Included in Windows Phone 8.1.

== Use cases ==
All versions of Internet Explorer for Windows from 4.0 onwards use MSHTML, and it is also used by various other web browsers and software components (see Internet Explorer shells). In Windows 98, Windows Me, and Windows 2000, it is also used for the Windows file manager/shell, Windows Explorer. The Add/Remove Programs tool in Windows 2000 uses MSHTML to render the list of installed programs, and in Windows XP it is also used for the User Accounts Control Panel, which is an HTML Application. MSHTML, however, was not used by Internet Explorer for Mac (which used Tasman starting with version 5.0), nor by the early versions of Internet Explorer Mobile.

Some other MSHTML-based applications include:

- AOL Explorer, a web browser
- AOL Instant Messenger 6.x, which used MSHTML to render conversation and profile windows, and advertisement panels
- EA Link, incompatible with MSHTML as of Internet Explorer 7 RC2
- Flashpoint Secure Player, uses MSHTML to run ActiveX based web games
- Google Talk, which used MSHTML to render chat windows and profile cards
- GreenBrowser, which is also presented at the BrowserChoice.eu page
- IE Tab, a browser add-on used to render pages with MSHTML user interface (originally available for both Mozilla Firefox and Google Chrome, now only for the latter)
- Impulse (content delivery), uses MSHTML to render "Explore" page, as well as several of the "Community" pages
- LimeWire, which renders the page "New@Lime"
- Lunascape, developed by Lunascape Corporation
- Maxthon, which used the MSHTML engine while adding features not built into IE7
- MediaBrowser, customized browsers, especially for Nintendo
- MenuBox, a web browser
- Microsoft Compiled HTML Help
- Microsoft Encarta and related products
- Microsoft InfoPath, a forms application
- Microsoft Outlook, which uses MSHTML to render HTML Messages (prior to Outlook 2007) and the "Outlook Today" screen
- Microsoft Outlook Express, which uses MSHTML to render HTML Messages
- Microsoft Visual InterDev 6 uses MSHTML in editing mode as visual HTML designer
- Microsoft Visual Studio 2002-2005 uses MSHTML in editing mode to provide visual ASP.NET/HTML designer
- Microsoft Visual Studio and Visual Basic to render the WebBrowser control
- MSN Messenger, which used it to produce Flash-based "winks" and games, and for all advertisements shown in the advertisement banner
- NeoPlanet, a web browser
- NetCaptor, a web browser
- Netscape Browser (Netscape 8), which used MSHTML to render web pages in IE mode
- RealNetworks RealPlayer, a multimedia player app
- Sleipnir, a web browser
- SlimBrowser, a web browser
- Skype, software for VoIP that renders HTML data with MSHTML
- Tencent Traveler, a web browser
- Valve's Steam client, previous versions of which used MSHTML to render the "Store", "Update News" and "Community" sections as well as the Steam in-game browser and MOTD screens in Valve games. The Steam client was updated to use WebKit instead of MSHTML for these features. Then was updated further to use the Chromium Embedded Framework
- Windows Live Writer, which uses MSHTML for its editor
- Windows Media Player, which uses MSHTML to render the "Media Information" pages
- WinRAR, a decompression program
- 360 Secure Browser, a web browser in China
- Baidu Browser, a web browser in China, that also had a proxy for some websites

== Standards compliance ==
Current versions of MSHTML, as of Internet Explorer 9, have introduced support for CSS 3, HTML5, and SVG, as well as other modern web standards. Web standards compliance was gradually improved with the evolution of MSHTML. Although each version of IE has improved standards support, including the introduction of a "standards-compliant mode" in version 6, the core standards that are used to build web pages (HTML and CSS) were sometimes implemented in an incomplete fashion. For example, there was no support for the <abbr> element which is part of the HTML 4.01 standard prior to IE 8. There were also some CSS attributes missing from MSHTML, like min-height, etc. as of Internet Explorer 6. As of Internet Explorer 8 CSS 2.1 is fully supported as well as some CSS 3.0 attributes. This lack of standards compliance has been known to cause rendering bugs and lack of support for modern web technologies, which often increases development time for web pages. Still, HTML rendering differences between standards-compliant browsers are not yet completely resolved.

== Microsoft alternatives ==
Apart from MSHTML, Microsoft also has and uses several other layout engines. One of them, known as Tasman, was used in Internet Explorer 5 for Mac. Development of Internet Explorer for Mac was halted in roughly 2003, but development of Tasman continued to a limited extent, and was later included in Office 2004 for Mac. Office for Mac 2011 uses the open source WebKit engine. Microsoft's now defunct web design product, Expression Web, as well as Visual Studio 2008 and later, do not use Internet Explorer's MSHTML engine, but rather a different engine.

In 2014, MSHTML was forked to create the engine EdgeHTML for Windows 10's Microsoft Edge (initially known as "Spartan" and now dubbed Microsoft Edge Legacy). Its new engine was "designed for interoperability with the modern web" and deprecates or removes a number of legacy components and behaviors, including document modes, ensuring that pure, standards-compliant HTML will render properly in browsers without the need for special considerations by web developers. This resulted in a completely new browser called Microsoft Edge (later referred to as "Microsoft Edge Legacy", with a flat blue "e" icon) which replaced Internet Explorer as Windows' stock browser and became the base of Microsoft's web related services, until its replacement with a Blink/Chromium-based browser, also called Microsoft Edge (sporting a new ocean wave-like icon) in late 2020.

== See also ==
- Comparison of browser engines
