= LoyaltyOne =

LoyaltyOne, Co.
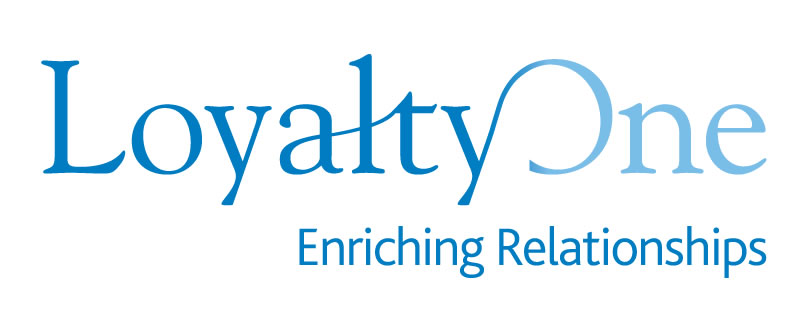
- Company type: Wholly owned subsidiary of Alliance Data
- Industry: Loyalty marketing and enterprise services
- Defunct: March 10, 2023
- Fate: Filed for Bankruptcy in 2023
- Headquarters: Toronto, Ontario, Canada
- Key people: Bryan A. Pearson (President and CEO)
- Services: Customer insight and strategy; Loyalty programs and marketing; Customer experience management
- Number of employees: 1,500
- Parent: Alliance Data
- Website: www.loyalty.com

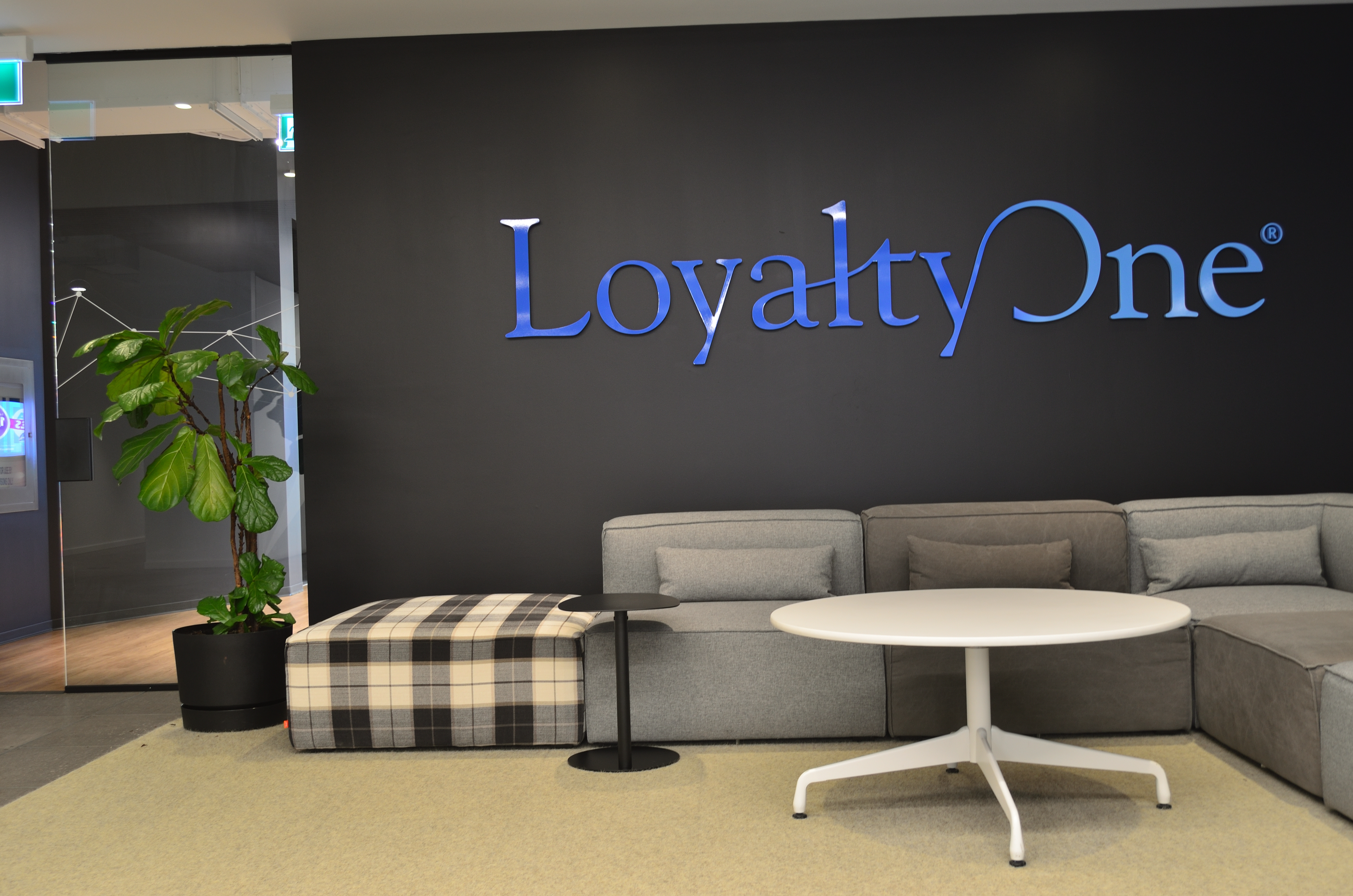
LoyaltyOne office in Toronto

LoyaltyOne, Co. provides loyalty marketing services to enterprises in retail, financial services, grocery, petroleum retail, travel, and hospitality sectors globally. Under the Alliance Data umbrella, it offers services in coalition loyalty programs, analytics and retail solutions, loyalty consulting and customer analytics.

On March 10, 2023, LoyaltyOne filed for bankruptcy.

== History ==
In 1991, entrepreneurs Craig Underwood, Sam Duboc, and Rob Gierkink began planning a coalition loyalty program, involving partners drawn from retail and financial services sectors. This resulted in the March 1992 launch of the Air Miles reward program. In 1998, Alliance Data acquired Loyalty Management Group Canada Inc., parent company of the AIR MILES program, and in 2008 renamed it LoyaltyOne.

== Businesses ==
=== Air Miles ===
Air Miles is a Canadian rewards program, with over 11 million active collector accounts within approximately two-thirds of all Canadian households. Cash Rewards or Dream Rewards are redeemable with hundreds of rewards partners across Canada.

==== 2016 points expiry issue ====
In 2011 Air Miles Canada announced that all points would expire with no compensation to its members after 5 years of being issued. In 2016 with months before the January 1st 2017 deadline was about to be enacted, Canadian news media began to heavily report on the impending deadline with stories of Canadian's struggling to redeem their long collected points. Members who redeemed the points fearing their loss were then outraged about having used up their collected points needlessly. Customers complained that they 'wasted' points on things they didn't want in fear of losing all the points that had been collected.

On December 1, 2016 Air Miles reversed their decision to expire members points, and cited that legislation that is about to be passed in Ontario that forbids the expiration of points would create problems in managing the program with various rules in each Province. In a statement release announcing the about face changes LoyaltyOne promised to ensure that they will still find a way to keep the rewards program profitable: "Going forward, LoyaltyOne will adjust the value proposition to collectors to offset the lost economics … and to maintain, as closely as possible, the economics of the Air Miles reward program prior to cancellation of the expiry policy" A proposed Class Action lawsuit was launched in Alberta.

On October 31, 2017, BrandSpark announces Air Miles as the most trusted brand in Loyalty Program category.

=== Precima ===
Precima is the LoyaltyOne data analytics arm specializing in applying data insights to sales strategies, and customer loyalty. Services include assortment optimization, price optimization, promotional optimization, targeted marketing, and supplier collaboration for Fortune 1000 brands in grocery retail.

=== BrandLoyalty ===
Founded in 1995 and acquired by Alliance Data in 2013, BrandLoyalty provides services in transactional and emotional loyalty, impacting consumer behavior through promotional campaign-driven loyalty programs.

In 2012, BrandLoyalty merged with IceMobile to expand in the digital space for short-term loyalty programs, instant loyalty programs, and digital solutions.

Grocers and brands partnering with BrandLoyalty in European and key Asian markets include REWE, Auchan, TESCO, Metro, Disney, Stikeez, Star Wars, and Jamie Oliver.

=== COLLOQUY Speaks ===
COLLOQUY Speaks offers research and insights on loyalty and customer experience industry trends.

=== IceMobile ===
IceMobile was founded by Ralph Cohen in 2002 and specializes in digital loyalty platforms and loyalty experience for high frequency retailers globally. Services include mobile solutions for loyalty stamp collecting, mobile app 1-to-1 communications for daily shoppers, and personalized promotions solutions. As part of Alliance Data, IceMobile offers advanced data analytics with Precima.

== Awards ==
LoyaltyOne has received awards covering marketing, contact centres, human resources, training and leadership. In 2012, LoyaltyOne was named one of Canada’s 50 Best Employers for its third consecutive year and one of Canada’s Greenest Employers.
