= NeoPlanet =

Graphical web browser

- NeoPlanet welcome page in NeoPlanet Browser running on Windows
- Developer: NeoPlanet Inc
- Release: 1997; 29 years ago
- Stable release: 1.262 / 2001; 25 years ago
- Operating system: Microsoft Windows
- Type: Web browser
- Website: www.neoplanet.com

NeoPlanet was a Trident-shell graphical web browser initially released in 1997 by New York–based Bigfoot International, Inc. and later maintained and developed by its subsidiary NeoPlanet, Inc. It was one of the first browsers to be fully skinnable.

Neoplanet was a "plug-out" extension for Internet Explorer which created an integrated branded environment for the user. Within the environment, users could web browse, email, and chat. Much simpler to use than basic browsers, Neoplanet was a portal-like browser created for non-techie users. Unlike web portals which lost control of the users every time they surfed to a new site, chatted, or emailed, Neoplanet's environment followed the users wherever they went on the Internet.

The Neoplanet program was originally created by James Friskel. Neoplanet Inc. was a subsidiary of Bigfoot International, Inc. Both companies were founded by Lenny Barshack and James Hoffman.

== History ==
A beta version of a trident shell NeoPlanet was released in October 1997, one month after Internet Explorer 4.0 release. It featured a built-in directory of channels further divided into categories and was for use with Windows 95 and NT. In the fall of 1998 Bigfoot released the NeoPlanet 2.0 version with a new feature of customizable interface. It was positioned as an adjunct to Netscape which it required to run, and as an alternative to Microsoft's and AOL offerings. The new version also featured Snap (a joint-venture between CNET and NBC) and Alexa services incorporated into the browser. The free 1.9MB download was a significant interface upgrade with four skins included and 16 more available on the newly launched NeoPlanet site, while the Microsoft Internet Explorer's underlying features remained unchanged.

In January 1999, Bigfoot spun out the NeoPlanet division into NeoPlanet, Inc. By spring 2000, NeoPlanet had moved its headquarters to Tempe, Arizona. It then raised $23 million from Integral Capital, J & W Seligman, Constellation Ventures, Broadview and several other investors during the second round of funding. Drew Cohen, hired by Barshack and Hoffman to head the new venture, relocated several Bigfoot team members to work on the project, including Warren Adelman (Business Development), Thomas Santoriello (Creative Design), and Frank Robledano (Content Direction). One of NeoPlanet's primary business strategies was to provide customizable browser interfaces to third parties, pioneering the branded browsers niche.

McAfee and Terra Lycos were among NeoPlanet's first partners, each launching multiple versions of branded browsers. Also in 1999, NeoPlanet, together with New Line Cinema, launched the Austin Powers browser to coincide with the premiere date of Austin Powers: The Spy Who Shagged Me. The Austin Powers Browser marked NeoPlanet's first branded browser for a feature film. The NeoPlanet/New Line launch of the Dr. Evil Browser soon followed.

With the release of version 5.0, Neoplanet made a move toward virtual communities. The browser described as an "Internet Desktop" added Macromedia Flash, instant messaging and the sharing of channels and other user-generated content.

Throughout 2000, NeoPlanet garnered partnerships to market and distribute branded browsers with major companies in the entertainment, computer manufacturing and sports arenas, including Universal Studios, Interscope/Geffen/A&M Records, USA Networks, MTV, The Lord of the Rings, TV Guide, Playboy Enterprises, Hewlett-Packard, Carolina Hurricanes and Phoenix Coyotes. Also, a "matching skins" campaign with RealNetworks allowed users to match the look-and-feel of the NeoPlanet Browser with that of RealNetworks' RealJukebox TM. The NFL's Baltimore Ravens collaborated with NeoPlanet to offer fans a customized web browser experience, accessible through Ravenszone.net, providing users with a Ravens-themed interface, complete with team-related visuals and direct links to exclusive content through their Super Bowl XXXV winning run.

Neoplanet's Grinch browser featuring custom branding of Internet Explorer, integrated email, channels and communities

Also in 2000, Universal Pictures launched the official Grinch Web Browser at www.meanone.com to promote the movie Dr. Seuss' How the Grinch Stole Christmas. The new browser featured unique interface designs with sounds and images from The Grinch movie and direct "channel" links to Grinch Web sites and the Universal Pictures Web sites. The Grinch Browser also featured a Lycos/Grinch Club, an integrated online community that provided movie fans with a vehicle for sharing similar interests with other users.

In 2001 NeoPlanet released its Viassary suite designed to personalize PC users` experience and to help companies to better understand and communicate with their customers. Compaq and HP were among its clients. As of 2001 the number of Neoplanet users reached 8 million.

Later that year, Bigfoot International Incorporated was divided and sold off by the Acxiom Corporation due to loss of investment and the dot-com collapse.

== Features ==
The client part of NeoPlanet browser resided on the desktop as a small application environment (less than 2Mbs) providing: Internet navigation, an embedded customizable directory, a new level of personalization through customization of the GUI, integrated e-mail, chat and automatic updates. The customizability of the application created ability for distribution and content partners to brand the user's online experience.

The server side of NeoPlanet's product enabled collection of rich data about the end-user's online experience, enabling timely and relevant targeted advertising.

=== Skins ===
Skins were a prominent feature of NeoPlanet, so much so that it is reported that the first ever use of the term "skin" as describing a customized interface was the result of a conversation between Robledano, Santoriello, and Friskel at a local pub, and after that was swiftly picked up by technology enthusiasts. It was the first browser to be fully skinnable. Many skins were created by users. NeoPlanet became popular for creating browsers for movies, such as New Line Cinema's Austin Powers: The Spy Who Shagged Me or Universal Pictures' How the Grinch Stole Christmas and sports teams, such as the Phoenix Coyotes. The browser had been branded by MTV, USA Networks, Interscope-Geffen-A&M, Hewlett-Packard, TV Guide among others. It had over 550 available skins as for October 2001 and 15 million skins downloads.

=== Integrated apps ===
In addition to e-mail, NeoPlanet integrated other Internet communications features, specifically, instant messaging, e-mail, and bookmark sharing.

=== The Channel Bar: customizable bookmarks ===
NeoPlanet was the first browser to include sophisticated bookmark management, what was referred to as the "Channel Bar". The channels offered a simple tree structure interface where users could visit the site and download entire channel packs related to specific types of content, sets of bookmarks that featured “best of” links for special interests, local information and web based resources, such as "Art", "Automotive", "Technology", and many others. Users were encouraged to share their own channels on the NeoPlanet site.

== Technology ==
NeoPlanet's client server architecture was built to allow future models to be plugged in via an object model. NeoPlanet's auto-update feature was designed to facilitate deploying these new features. The front-end was a complex layered series of software objects that are presented to the user as one unified application. This was accomplished through an abstraction layer which allows for independence of the HTML rendering engines, independence of look and feel for re-branding/distribution by partners, and communication with the NeoPlanet back-end. The NeoPlanet front-end had the ability to dynamically respond to requests from the back-end to update itself in whole or in part.

NeoPlanet's client/server architecture also included a scalable back-end server component. The NeoPlanet back-end had the ability to track and target marketing and promotions, even through corporate firewalls.

=== Issued patents ===
- Messaging system for indicating status of a sender of electronic mail and method and computer program product therefor
- Method in a computer system for embedding a child window in a parent window

== See also ==
- List of web browsers
