= Fenrir Inc =

Software company in Japan

- Traded as: Fenrir Inc.
- Industry: Computer software
- Founded: 2005
- Headquarters: Headquarters: Umeda, Osaka Branch: Shinagawa, Tokyo, Osaka, Japan
- Products: Sleipnir; FenrirFS; Fenrir Pass; SnapCrab; PictBear; Inkiness; FlickAddress; Grani
- Services: Online service Computer software
- Website: www.fenrir-inc.com (in Japanese)

Fenrir Inc is a software company based in the Umeda district of Osaka, Japan. Fenrir Inc. develops the Sleipnir Web browser for Windows, Mac, Android, iPhone / iPad and Windows Phone.

== History ==
Fenrir Inc. was established in June, 2005 after the source code of the original version of Sleipnir was stolen. Sleipnir 2 announced in October, 2005. Sleipnir Mobile for Android Web browser released on September 15, 2011. Sleipnir 3 for Mac Web browser released on November 2, 2011. Sleipnir 3 for Windows Web browser released on November 16, 2011.

== Software ==
- Sleipnir - Web browser available for Windows, Mac, Android, iPhone / iPad and Windows Phone.
- Fenrir Pass - Cloud service to sync bookmarks and services.
- FenrirFS - File management software.
- SnapCrab - Screen capture application.
- PictBear - Paint and image editing application.
- Inkiness - Drawing app for iOS.
- FlickAddress - Address book app for iOS.

== Software in Japan ==
Fenrir Inc. has provided a variety of products to Japanese users.

Grani - Collaboration Web browser offering designs of various companies and characters. The following designs are available:

Kabukibito, Shonenjump (Naruto, Bleach, One Piece), Modern pets, Fueki, Mr Men Little Miss, Gaspard et Lisa, Pingu, Suumo, Thomas, Cerezo Osaka, Aronzo, Gloomy, Urban Research, Cybozu, Infoseek Rakuten.

Sleipnirstart - A start page for accessing all favourite sites and searching them. Sites include Yahoo, Rakuten, Gyao, Hatena.
