= Vertex (company) =

VERTEX
- Company type: Limited Company
- Industry: Utilities, call centers
- Founded: 1996
- Headquarters: London, UK
- Key people: Andrew Jornod, CEO, Vertex North America (Utilities)
- Products: Business Process Outsourcing, Customer Management Outsourcing

Vertex is a call centre operator that also offers a variety of other business process outsourcing (BPO) and customer management outsourcing services.

Originally the back office service function inside UK utility company United Utilities, Vertex was spun out as a separate company in 1996. In 2007, United Utilities sold Vertex to a consortium of investors (Oak Hill Capital, GenNx360, Knox Lawrence International) for £217m.

Vertex services include:

- Business process outsourcing
- Customer Management
- Finance & Accounting
- HR Outsourcing
- Software
- Offshoring
- Debt Management
- Telecom
