= GreenBrowser =

Discontinued freeware web browser

- Screenshot of GreenBrowser 6.7.0417
- Original author(s): morequick
- Final release: 6.9.1223 / 23 December 2016; 8 years ago
- Operating system: Windows
- License: Freeware
- Website: www.morequick.com/indexen.htm

GreenBrowser is a discontinued freeware web browser based on Internet Explorer's core. GreenBrowser is based upon the Trident rendering engine used in Internet Explorer.

GreenBrowser is a full-featured browser, highly customizable but compact in size and low in memory requirements. GreenBrowser is similar to Maxthon, and closely related to the MyIE browser. Some addons and plugins designed for Maxthon will also work with GreenBrowser. GreenBrowser features many automation features as standard, such as an ad filter, auto form fill, auto scroll, auto save, auto refresh.

GreenBrowser is a product from morequick, a software organization based in China. Simplified Chinese language is built into the browser. The browser also has certain idiosyncrasies, such as many toolbars and icons are enabled by default. When GreenBrowser is running, the green G logo floats over all pages but can be turned off by right-clicking on it and unchecking the "Monitor" option.

GreenBrowser was one of the twelve browsers offered to European Economic Area users of Microsoft Windows in 2010 at BrowserChoice.eu.
