= Air Miles =

Canadian miles-based loyalty program

- Air Miles logo used in Canada until June 2026
- Type: Loyalty program
- Area served: Bahrain; Canada; the Netherlands; Qatar; UAE
- Introduced: November 1988; 38 years ago
- Number of users: 10,000,000+
- Accrual: Shopping
- Accrual partners: American Express; Bank of Montreal; Marlin Travel; Metro; Instacart
- Rewards: Travel; cashback; electronics; entertainment; personal care; appliances
- Website: bluerewards.ca airmilesme.com airmiles.nl

Air Miles, previously called Airmiles, is a group of loyalty programs operated by different companies in each region where the brand has operated. Originally launched in 1988 in the United Kingdom by British Airways, the programs have been available in the United Kingdom, Canada, the Netherlands, Bahrain, Qatar, United Arab Emirates, and the United States. Points are earned on purchases at participating merchants and can be redeemed against flights with specific airlines.

British Airways also operated a separate program called BA Miles, and it discontinued its Air Miles involvement in 2011 by merging its Air Miles with the BA Miles program. The Air Miles program in the United States was unsuccessful; after being launched in 1992, it stopped operating in 1993.

The Canadian program was also launched in 1992. Since 2017, the Air Miles name and trademarks in Canada have been owned by Diversified Royalty Corp. In 2023, after introducing a controversial expiration of the points retained in the program and the withdrawal of several major participating retailers from the program, the owner of the Canadian program, LoyaltyOne, filed for bankruptcy, leading to an acquisition of the remaining Canadian operations (but not the trademarks) by the Bank of Montreal (BMO). In 2026, the Canadian program was replaced with a new program called Blue Rewards.

Air Miles programs are also operated in Netherlands and the Middle East.

== History ==
The Air Miles concept was created by Sir Keith Mills and began operating in the United Kingdom in November 1988. British company Loyalty Management Group (LMG) operated the program and licensed the rights to it in other countries by other operators.

LMG was later acquired by Canadian firm Group Aeroplan, now Aimia, which has retained the intellectual property associated with the Air Miles name and logo internationally and is the majority partner in the Air Miles program in the Middle East.

In countries in which Air Miles programs operate other than Canada, Diversified Royalty Corp (DIV) is the licensor of the Air Miles programs and is not involved in program operation. In Canada, it competes directly with Aimia's former program, Aeroplan, now owned directly by Air Canada. Similarly, the former Air Miles program in the UK had no affiliation with the Nectar program operated by Aimia.

=== Air Miles Canada ===
Air Miles logo used in Canada until October 2021

The Air Miles reward program in Canada was launched in 1992, and by 2008 it had become Canada's largest coalition loyalty program. In 1998, Air Miles Canada was acquired by Alliance Data Systems. In 2008, Alliance Data Loyalty Services became known as LoyaltyOne.

In 2017, Aimia sold the rights to the Air Miles trademarks for Canada to Diversified Royalty Corp (DIV). In 2026, DIV and Bank of Montreal (BMO) entered into an amended agreement where BMO would license the Air Miles trademarks until 1 February 2032.

Air Miles Canada has a number of sponsors, including Bank of Montreal, American Express, retail partners such as Jean Coutu pharmacies, and the Eastlink cable company. Their online partners such as Amazon and eBay are available through their shopping portal Airmiles shops.

Consumers collected Air Miles reward miles from sponsors, which could be redeemed for 1,200 reward choices, such as travel, entertainment, home electronics and gift cards. Consumers get the best value for their Air Miles when they use them for travel for Dream Rewards or promotions for Cash Rewards in stores.

In April 2009, Air Miles Canada launched My Planet, an initiative to help people trade in their Air Miles for environmentally conscious products and services. Initially, My Planet offered collectors over 140 "green" redemption items, including public transit passes, organic cotton linens, and electric scooters. In September 2009, the program was extended to stores and point of purchase.

Air Miles Canada received awards for marketing, customer care/call centers, human resources, training, and leadership. However, on 4 October 2021, Air Miles introduced a series of revisions to the program.

In 2011, Air Miles Canada announced that points earned by Canadian collectors would expire after five years. All points collected from inception to the end of 2011 would expire at midnight on 1 January 2017. The announcement generally went unnoticed at the time.

In 2016, as the deadline for redeeming points came closer, the media began to report on Canadian collectors struggling to redeem their points, frustrations with customer service, accusations that reward offers were being manipulated to discourage redemption and that merchandise was being hidden from some customers.

On 1 December 30 days before the expiry deadline, Loyalty One reversed the policy, citing an impending Private Members Bill in the Legislative Assembly of Ontario that would ban the expiration of points in the province of Ontario.

It is estimated Air Miles intended to gain an estimated $180 to 250 million, due to the expiration of points (CAD), for the balance sheet of its parent company, US-based Alliance Data. The cancellation resulted in a US$242 million charge against fourth quarter 2016 earnings.

On 31 January 2021, Lowe's and its subsidiaries Rona, Inc. and Réno-Dépôt officially ended their partnership with Air Miles; as of 1 February 2021; all of their retail and online stores stopped accepting Air Miles. On 31 March 2021, Liquor Control Board of Ontario ended their partnership with Air Miles and stopped accepting Air Miles at all of their retail and online store.

In 2022, Staples Canada and the parent of Sobeys and Safeway stores ended their partnerships with Air Miles. Staples stopped accepting Air Miles cards in July of that year, and Sobeys and Safeway stores began phasing out acceptance of Air Miles after 10 August 2022.

==== 2023–present: Under Bank of Montreal ====
Blue Rewards logo

On 10 March 2023, Air Miles' owner LoyaltyOne filed for bankruptcy in Canada, and Chapter 11 bankruptcy in the U.S., and entered in to purchase agreement with Bank of Montreal (BMO) for US$160 million, with the acquisition being completed on 1 June 2023. On 4 July 2023, American Express announced it would be ending its partnership with Air Miles and winding down its Air Miles co-branded credit cards by 30 September. Existing customers were transitioned to cards featuring Amex's competing Membership Rewards program.

On 26 January 2026, BMO announced it would be replacing Air Miles with a new program called Blue Rewards beginning in the summer of 2026. On the same day, Shell Canada announced it was ending its 34-year partnership with Air Miles and would be joining the Scene+ loyalty program beginning in March 2026. BMO contracted to continue to license the intellectual property related to Air Miles from DIV through 1 February 2032, but not the trademarks.

=== Air Miles Middle East ===
In the Middle East, the program is operated by Rewards Management Middle East. Controlled by Aimia (formerly Groupe Aeroplan), it operates a single program across the United Arab Emirates, Qatar, and Bahrain.

Since the launch in 2001, over 1.4 million members have enrolled from across the UAE, Qatar, and Bahrain. Members collect Air Miles on everyday shopping from a range of partners including HSBC, Spinneys, Sharaf DG, Damas, Chilli's, African & Eastern. Members who are HSBC credit cardholders are credited Air Miles for credit card transactions. Airline partners include Emirates, Etihad and Qatar Airways.

=== Air Miles Netherlands ===
Air Miles was first brought to the attention of potential business partners in the Netherlands by Keith Mills, Liam Cowdrey and Philip Beard during 1993, by way of an introduction from a senior ABN AMRO bank executive who had come across Air Miles during his international travels. In early 1994, Robert Gierkink was hired away from Air Miles Canada to lead an Amsterdam-based start-up team consisting of Todd Almeida, Frank Fisser, Fred Metman and Renee Belloni.

ABN AMRO, Albert Heijn, Shell, Vroom & Dreesmann, and KLM were contractually confirmed as anchor partners during the summer and the Air Miles program launched via a massive advertising campaign in October 1994. The program enjoyed immediate success, with millions of Dutch households enrolling into the program before year's end.

More than a dozen additional retailers also joined the Air Miles program just prior to - or within a year - following the launch. These included Praxis, Etos, Gall & Gall, Blokker, Hunkemoller, Videoland and several others.

Similar to other Air Miles programs, Air Miles in the Netherlands originally included flights. But it also added a handful of other travel and leisure rewards. The initial rewards were KLM, Center Parcs, NS (Dutch Rail), Stena Line, Efteling and Noorder Dierenpark Emmen. In 1998, the reward program was expanded to include a wide-ranging catalogue of merchandise redemption options.

The program's popularity later waned starting in 2004, when ABN AMRO ceased its participation. Albert Heijn subsequently limited its issuance of Air Miles just to private-label products to allow for greater product discounting via its Bonus Card program. At Shell gas stations, customers can choose between Air Miles or stamps. Currently

Air Miles has over 3.8 million active users, making it the largest loyalty program in the Netherlands. In this country, the program had announced that points would expire after the 5-year mark for its customers starting in 2018. As of June 2026, Air Miles Netherlands remains in operation.

=== Air Miles United Kingdom ===
Both sides of a typical UK paper Air Miles voucher

Air Miles in the UK was created in the mid-1980s by Alan Deller, Commercial Director of British Caledonian Airways and the partners of advertising agency Mills, Smith & Partners – initially Keith Mills, Brian Smith, William Kershaw, Nick Tomlin, Peter Badham and Geoffrey Bean and later Liam Cowdrey. Together they formed the Air Miles Travel Promotions Limited in 1986 and sold 51% of the UK operation to British Airways soon after.

They produced the consumer launch campaign "Stop dreaming. Start Collecting", gaining a database of three million Air Miles collectors in the first three months. Keith Mills later founded the Nectar loyalty card. Operations in the UK commenced in November 1988.

In 2007, the United Kingdom Air Miles business had eight million customers. Airmiles could be collected through Lloyds TSB Airmiles Duo credit card accounts, Shell petrol stations, Tesco supermarkets (50 airmiles for every £2.50 in Tesco Club Card vouchers), Southern Electric, travel products, package holidays purchased from Air Miles and over 100 online retailers.

The British program had an online shopping portal including retailers such as eBay and Currys. Airmiles could be redeemed for flights with British Airways and other airlines, Eurostar and ferry crossings, cruises, hotel accommodation, car hire, travel insurance, package holidays, spa and golf breaks and leisure activities. It was based in Crawley.

Air Miles was a subsidiary of British Airways, but the airline also operated a different scheme for its frequent flyers called BA Miles.

In September 2011, Air Miles announced that it would be rebranding to Avios and that taxes and charges would then be chargeable, quoting £497 for a return flight to Sydney; many previous users expressed regret and anger over this. The Airmiles scheme was combined with BA Miles and ended at midnight 14 November.

=== Air Miles United States ===
An Air Miles program was launched in the United States in 1992 by Loyalty Management Group, although it did not include any U.S.-based airlines. Participating companies included Lenscrafters, General Cinema, AT&T Corporation, and Citibank. The U.S. program was unsuccessful and suspended operations in May 1993.
