= Citrio =

Name used by a web browser and a video game cheat software service

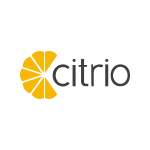
- Developers: Catalina Group Ltd. Epom Ad Server
- Release: Apr/May 2013

Stable release(s)
- Windows: 50.0.2661.276 / April 25, 2017; 9 years ago
- macOS: 50.0.2661.275 / February 27, 2017; 9 years ago
- Operating system: Windows XP and later, Mac OS X 10.6 and later, Android
- Size: 56.3 MB
- Available in: English
- License: Adware
- Website: citrio.com

Citrio is a name used for two types of software: the Citrio web browser and CITR.IO, a provider of software used for cheating in online games. Both are described below.

== Citrio web browser ==
Citrio is an adware web browser developed by Catalina Group Ltd. and distributed by Epom Ad Server. Citrio is available for Windows and Mac OS X. Citrio has a download manager that includes Bittorrent support, a video downloader, a media player and a proxy switcher. Citrio is based on the open source Chromium web browser project, which makes it compatible with all extensions, apps and themes from Chrome Web Store.

Citrio is known to trigger warnings from antivirus software, as it downloads privacy-invading extensions in the background and all users' data is tracked and collected by Epom for the purpose of selling ads; this has led some to categorize Citrio as adware.

=== Features ===
Citrio has a built-in download manager that allows to pause and resume downloads, sorts downloaded files by date, type and download status. The browser has an inbuilt BitTorrent client which allows to download torrent files and magnet links without additional software. Citrio's video grabber makes it possible to download files from multiple online video websites. Downloaded torrents and videos are displayed together with the other downloads in a respective section in the browser. A built-in media player can play video files while their download is still in progress. Citrio has a built-in ad blocking extension.

=== History and development ===
Citrio browser is distributed by Epom Ad Server and developed by Catalina Group. Citrio was initially released in 2013 with a number of its core features, such as the download manager, torrent manager, video downloader and proxy switcher.

==== Release history ====
- 38.0.2125.244 - Social sharing extension added; redesigned download manager page.
- 39.0.2171.248 - Option to edit torrents after the download has been started; free Premium account on file hosting service 4shared.
- 41.0.2272.254 - Media player introduced that enabled to watch videos in the process of the download.
- 42.0.2311.258 - Added audio extractor option for converting video to mp3.
- 44.0.2403.264 - Playlists supports has been added to the media player for video and audio files.
- 44.0.2403.265 - ad-blocking extension has been added.
- 50.0.2661.273 - Latest with proxy and download manager

=== Reception ===
Reviews of Citrio's downloading capabilities have been mixed. Softpedia described the download manager and torrent client as well-designed for everyday use, but reported that the built-in torrent downloader failed to retrieve content from several sources during testing, and that the video downloader did not detect videos played from within a YouTube playlist.

Others have criticized it as adware and a security risk, with misleading promotional materials and privacy-invading user data collection.

In February 2015, CNET reviewed Citrio with the following conclusion: “...if you download a lot of media files from the Internet, you should definitely give Citrio a try. It offers one of the easiest ways we've seen to download files, and, aside from the Ask [toolbar] "optimization," there was a lot to like in this free browser.”

Softonic's review of Citrio similarly concludes: "Although Citrio is promoted as a secure browser, the installation of the programme is known to set off malware warnings and is can be considered adware. You also are unable to opt out of installing the privacy-invading Ask toolbar during the initial installation. There is still a lot to like about this browser...."

== CITR.IO gaming software ==
CITR.IO
- Release: 2019
- Available in: Multiple languages
- Type: Video game cheat software
- Website: citrio.ac

A second software service using the Citrio name is CITR.IO, a provider of video game cheat software. The service has been associated with the domain citr.io and later with citrio.ac.

Online gaming communities have associated CITR.IO with cheat software for Tom Clancy's Rainbow Six Siege. In a 2020 discussion about Rainbow Six Siege cheats, Reddit users listed Citr.io among paid Siege cheat providers. A 2020 YouTube video titled Rainbow Six Siege Hacking | CITR.IO also identifies the name with Rainbow Six Siege cheating content.

Gaming-community claims have also linked CITR.IO to exploits such as knife through walls and planting the defuser outside normal bomb-site locations. A documentary-style YouTube video discussing the origin of the “knife through walls” exploit states that CITR.IO was connected to those exploits.

The later domain citrio.ac presents itself as a cheat provider and advertises Overwatch-related cheat slots.
