= SlimBrowser =

Web browser from FlashPeak

- Typical Slimjet screenshot
- Developers: FlashPeak, Inc.

Stable release(s)
- 18.0.0.0 (August 31, 2023; 3 years ago) [±]
- Engines: Gecko
- Operating system: Windows
- Type: Web browser
- License: Freeware
- Website: www.slimbrowser.net

SlimBrowser is a tabbed multiple-site web browser from FlashPeak, Inc., an Austin, Texas-based company.

It formerly used the Microsoft Trident layout engine. It incorporates a large collection of features like built-in popup killer, skinned window frame, form filler, site group, quick-search, auto login, hidden sites, built-in commands and scripting, online translation, script error suppression, blacklist/whitelist filtering, and URL Alias.

SlimBrowser was one of the twelve browser choices offered to European Economic Area users of Microsoft Windows in 2010.

Since V6.0, SlimBrowser has adopted a multi-process architecture to improve stability and eliminate performance restrictions associated with traditional single-process browsers. SlimBrowser included a full-featured form filler with the support of multiple identities in V6.01.

After development had been paused, it started again in 2019, switching to Gecko engine, counting versions from V10.0.

== Other browsers ==
FlashPeak also makes the cross-platform browser SlimJet which uses Chromium (Blink engine). SlimBoat used WebKit, but is no longer supported.
