= Message of the day =

Message shown to computer users on login

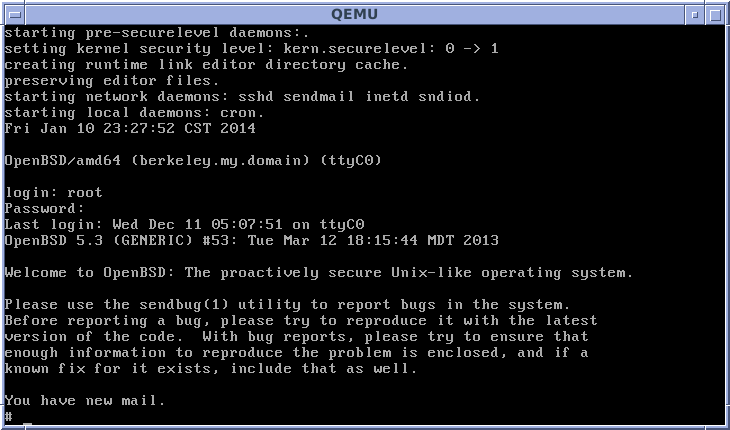
Default motd showing on OpenBSD 5.3

Many computer systems display a message of the day or welcome message when a user first connects to them, logs in to them, or starts them. It is a way of sending a common message to all users, and may include information about system changes, system availability, and so on. More recently, systems have displayed personalized messages of the day.

On many time-sharing systems, the contents of the message of the day are fetched from a system file:

- Compatible Time-Sharing System;
- Multics: the motd info segment;
- TOPS-10
- Incompatible Timesharing System (ITS)
- Unix-like systems: the /etc/motd file
- Univac VS/9
- CP/CMS

== Usage ==
The contents of the special file are displayed after the user logs in successfully, typically before the login shell is started.

Newer Unix-like systems may generate the message dynamically when the host boots or a user logs in.

Various server-based PC games display messages of the day, including Half-Life, Call of Duty, Minecraft, and Battlefield. They may be personalized, encouraging users to try new features or make in-game purchases.

Some IRC servers also display a message of the day on login.

== See also ==
- System console
- fortune (Unix)
