= Sleipnir (web browser) =

Web browser developed by Fenrir Inc

- Sleipnir 6.5.11.4000 on Windows 10
- Developers: Fenrir Inc, Osaka, Japan

Stable release(s) [±]
- Windows (Sleipnir 6) 6.5.14 (December 23, 2025; 3 months ago) Windows (Sleipnir 4) 4.8.14 (December 23, 2025; 3 months ago) iOS 5.0.4 (December 24, 2025; 3 months ago) Android 3.8.5 Update 1 (December 23, 2025; 3 months ago)
- Operating system: Windows, macOS, iOS, Android, Android TV, Windows Phone
- Type: Web browser; Mobile browser
- License: Freeware
- Website: www.fenrir-inc.com/jp/sleipnir/ (in Japanese)

Sleipnir is a tabbed web browser developed by Fenrir Inc. The browser's main features are customization and tab functions. It supports HTML5 and multiple layout engines.

The names Sleipnir and Fenrir are both names of animals from Norse mythology.

Sleipnir was originally created in Japanese and then released with English and Chinese translations. Further translations are performed by volunteer translators.

It is available for Microsoft Windows, Android and select regions for iOS. Older versions for macOS are available on third-party websites. Older versions were available for Windows Phone, prior to the shutdown of the Windows Phone Store.

== History ==
Sleipnir was originally developed by Yasuyuki Kashiwagi. In November 2004, the computer containing Sleipnir's source code was stolen. In 2005, Kashiwagi established Fenrir & Co. to start development of a new version of Sleipnir. Starting with version 2, the new versions are not compatible with the original.

As of 2006 Sleipnir had 6% market share in Japan.

Sleipnir was one of twelve browsers originally offered in a browser ballot screen on the EU edition of Windows 7 (and XP and Vista with an update), so users could choose between Internet Explorer and other browsers during the installation process.

The stable version 5.0 was released on December 24, 2013 with the latest Blink engine.

== Features ==
In the Windows version, the browser's layout engine can be changed. Internet Explorer's Trident and Mozilla's Gecko were supported. As of version 3.5.0.4000, support for the WebKit rendering engine was implemented and Gecko rendering engine support was terminated. Other features include tab grouping, mouse gestures, page zooming, a search bar, Greasemonkey-like user script support, and plugin support. Bookmarks on Sleipnir can be synced with different platform, using a function called Fenrir Pass.

Sleipnir version 5 and onward introduce a proprietary text rendering visually resembling Mac OS text rendering. The feature is not mentioned in their Mac feature set.

== Platforms ==
Sleipnir 2 for Windows: Sleipnir 2 features customizable functions and add-ons created by users.

Sleipnir 3 for Windows: Includes tab options, tab groups, Touchpaging to flick between tabs using your mouse, and mouse gestures.

Sleipnir 3 for Mac: Switch tabs by swiping tabs left or right-click; Operate tabs using gestures; TiledTab - Pinch-in on the TrackPad to view a list of tabs; Hold And Go - Hold down on a link to open in the background; Ad Block; Tab groups for managing tabs; Sync bookmarks with other devices using Fenrir Pass; The standard full-screen with Mac OS X Lion

Sleipnir 4 for Windows: Sleipnir 4 for Windows has introduced minor interface improvements; Smart Tabs - adding, positioning and deletion of tabs is determined based on relationship with previous and next tabs; 150 mouse gesture functions added; Google Chrome extensions support.

Sleipnir 4 for Mac: Thumbnail Tab Navigation - open tabs are not shrunk anymore, instead they are presented in a scrollable list, with tab titles appearing on mouse hover; Portal field - a bar with a double functionality of navigation bar and search; TiledTab - view mode that gives an overview of the opened tabs and allows sorting tabs into six groups; Improved gesture controls.

Sleipnir 5 for Windows: Sleipnir 5 for Windows has integrated all of the features introduced in Sleipnir 4 for Mac; Smooth OSX-like font rendering engine introduced; "Site Updates" feature shows personalized recommendations of articles from the often visited sites; Added touch screen support.

Sleipnir 6 for Windows: Sleipnir 6 for Windows adds FavTab for quick navigation to favorite sites; SmartSearch for searching via highlighting; resizable portal field.

Sleipnir 6.5 for Windows: Sleipnir 6.5 for Windows is a customizable web browser that offers advanced tab management, non-member social feeds, mouse gestures and privacy protection features.

Sleipnir Mobile: The following mobile versions of Sleipnir for smartphones have been released: Android, iOS, and Windows Phone.

== Reception ==
Early Gecko-based versions of Sleipnir for Windows scored positive reviews from CNET for the design and functionality, most noticeably, for the inclusion of gestures. “The action is very smooth and natural and a lot like scrolling through pages on your phone with your thumb.” The OSX version review by MakeUseOf followed generally the same line while additionally bringing attention to the convenient tab management.

MacWorld, while reviewing Sleipnir 4 for Mac has praised how the URL bar was changed. “Opera pioneered that idea, but Sleipnir’s tabs remain constantly visible and strike a nice balance between being large enough to identify but small enough not to intrude on the main browser window.” Despite this, version 4 was criticized for its poor performance, compared to other browsers using WebKit.

Later versions of Sleipnir received positive reviews from Softpedia, due to the browser's customizability, features and the availability of mobile versions. “Sleipnir proves to be a stable and fast web browser that comes with innovative functions and various customization possibilities. The extra security features, together with smartphone and web apps linking are features that make it a viable alternative to its more popular competitors.”

In 2012, multiple performance tests were performed by Tom's Hardware, where the Android version of Sleipnir was placed on the third spot as the best browser for Android, outrun by Dolphin and Maxthon.

== See also ==
- List of feed aggregators
- Comparison of feed aggregators
