= Lunascape =

Web browser

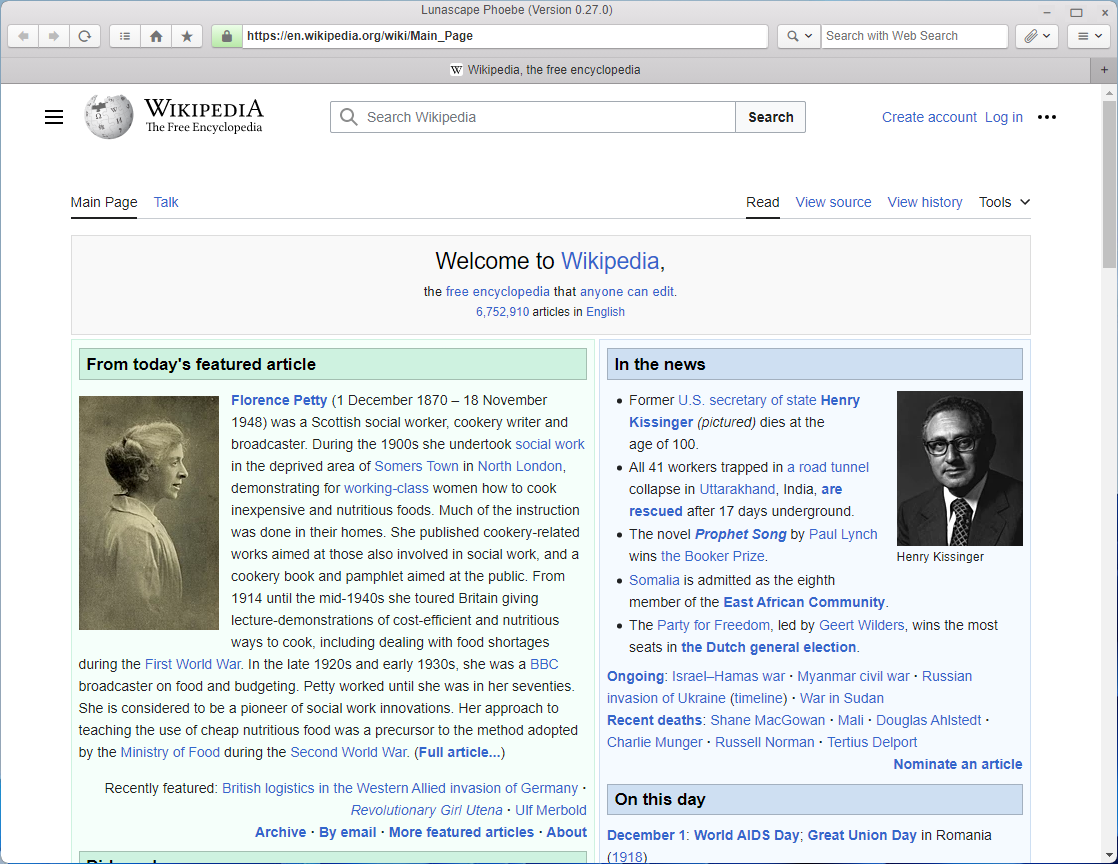
- Screenshot of the Lunascape browser
- Developer: Lunascape Corporation
- Release: October 2001; 25 years ago
- Engine: Gecko, Trident, WebKit
- Operating system: macOS, iOS, iPadOS, visionOS, Windows, Android
- Available in: 28 languages
- List of languages American English, British English, French, German, Italian, Portuguese, Russian, Spanish, Chinese, Korean, Japanese, Bulgarian, Croatian, Czech, Danish, Dutch, Estonian, Finnish, Greek, Hungarian, Latvian, Lithuanian, Norwegian, Polish, Romanian, Slovak, Slovenian, Swedish
- Type: Web browser
- License: Freeware
- Website: www.lunascape.org

Lunascape is a web browser developed by Lunascape Corporation in Tokyo, Japan. It is unusual in that it contains three rendering engines: Gecko (used in Mozilla Firefox), WebKit (used in Apple's Safari), and Trident (used in Microsoft Internet Explorer). The user can switch between layout engines seamlessly.

Lunascape is available for Windows and Android platforms, as well as macOS, iOS, iPadOS, and visionOS.

== History ==
Lunascape was released in October 2001 while the founders were in college. As the browser became popular, Hidekazu Kondo established the Lunascape Corporation in August 2004 while pursuing a PhD. Hidekazu Kondo then became the CEO of Lunascape Corporation. Additionally, Lunascape was selected as an "Exploratory Software Project" commissioned by the Japanese government.

The company established a subsidiary in the United States in June 2008 based in Sunnyvale, California.

Lunascape introduced its browser internationally in December 2008.

On April 6, 2017, Lunascape Corporation was acquired by Media Do

On November 30, 2019, the Lunascape web browser business was acquired by G.U.Labs, with Hidekazu Kondo becoming the representative director and CEO of G.U.Labs.

On December 1, 2019, Lunascape Corporation was dissolved and merged into Media Do.
