= Maxthon =

Freeware web browser

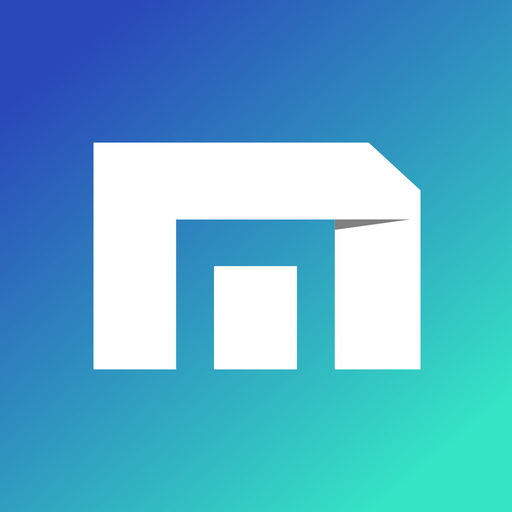

- Screenshot of Maxthon 7 taken on Windows 11
- Developer: Maxthon limited Ltd
- Release: 2002; 24 years ago

Stable release(s)
- Android: 7.0.2.2600 / 29 June 2023
- iOS: 7.1.9 / 22 August 2023
- Linux: 1.0.5.3 / 9 September 2014
- macOS: 5.1.70 / 29 September 2022
- Windows: 7.1.7.8100 / 11 December 2023

Preview release(s) [±]
- 6.2.0.2100 (beta) (October 19, 2022; 3 years ago) [±]
- Written in: C++
- Engines: Blink, (WebKit on iOS)
- Operating system: Windows, macOS, Linux, Android, Windows Phone, iOS
- Size: ≈39 MB
- Available in: 53 languages
- Type: Web browser
- License: Freeware
- Website: www.maxthon.com

Maxthon (Chinese: 傲游浏览器, formerly named MyIE2) is a freeware web browser, created by Jeff Chen in Singapore. It is available for Windows, macOS, Linux, and as Maxthon Mobile for Android, iOS, and Windows Phone 8. Since version 6, Maxthon is based on Chromium.

== Overview ==
Maxthon is a Hong Kong company known mainly for producing web browsers for Windows. It is headquartered in Singapore, with offices in Beijing, Hong Kong, and San Francisco, US. Most of Maxthon's team work remotely around the world, which develops and maintains versions of the Maxthon browser for Windows, macOS, Android, iOS, and Windows Phone.

Maxthon has also created other products, including a news and information portal (with Chinese and English versions), a casual gaming portal and humor website, a "kid-safe" web browser for Android and iOS, and a free online account system named Maxthon Passport.

== Corporate history ==
In 2002, current CEO Ming Jie "Jeff" Chen (Chinese: 陈明杰; pinyin: Chén Míngjié) created MyIE2 browser based on open source product MyIE, in Singapore, and renamed to "Maxthon" in 2003. In 2005, the team received seed funding from venture capital firm WI Harper Group and Morten Lund, the first Skype investor, and Chen moved the company to Beijing. In 2006, Maxthon received further investment from the US-based venture capital firm Charles River Ventures.

Maxthon was one of the twelve browsers Microsoft presented in 2010 at BrowserChoice.eu, a website allowing users of Windows residing in the European Economic Area to choose which default web browser to use on their computer. In late 2010, Maxthon began releasing for new platforms, including browsers for Android Mac, iPhone and iPad. The Maxthon Cloud Browser was released on December 10, 2012.

== Investment from Google ==
On April 10, 2007, TechCrunch reported that Google had invested at least US$1 million in Maxthon; this was denied the following day by Chen. However, in an interview with the Chinese web portal Sina.com, Chen did not rule out future "cooperation" between the two businesses.

== Awards ==
Maxthon Browser has received several awards and recognition over the years for its innovative features and user-friendly interface. Some of the awards and recognition include:

- WebWare 100 Winner: Maxthon was selected as one of the top 100 web applications by WebWare 2009, a CNET site.
- About.com Reader's Choice Awards (2009, 2011,2014): Maxthon was voted as the Best Alternative Browser by the readers of About.com in both 2009, 2011 and 2014.
- Red Herring 100 Asia (2013): Maxthon was included in the Red Herring 100 Asia list, recognising the most promising private technology ventures from the Asian business region.
- PCWorld's 100 Best Products of 2011: Maxthon was ranked among the top 100 products by PCWorld magazine in 2011.

=== Data privacy issues ===
In 2016, computer security researchers from Fidelis Cybersecurity and Exatel discovered the browser surreptitiously sending sensitive browsing and system data, such as ad blocker status, websites visited, searches conducted, and applications installed with their version numbers, to remote servers located in Beijing, China. According to Maxthon, the data is sent as part of the firm's 'User Experience Improvement Program' and it is "voluntary and totally anonymous." However, researchers found the data still being collected and sent to remote servers even after users explicitly opted out of the program. The researchers further found the data being sent over an unencrypted connection (HTTP), leaving users vulnerable to man-in-the-middle attacks. Fidelis' Chief Security Officer, Justin Harvey, noted the data "contains almost everything you would want in conducting a reconnaissance operation to know exactly where to attack. Knowing the exact operating system and installed applications, and browsing habits it would be trivial to send a perfectly crafted spear phish to the victim or perhaps set up a watering hole attack on one of their most frequented websites." Maxthon CEO Jeff Chen claimed that this was due to a bug that was fixed as soon as Maxthon was made aware of the issue; however, Exatel had notified Maxthon of the issue without getting any response. The issue was found in Maxthon version 4.4.5. According to Maxthon, it was fixed in a later version and no such issue was reported since then.

== Software ==
=== Development history ===
According to Chen, Maxthon was based on MyIE, a popular modification to Internet Explorer created by Chinese programmer Changyou. Changyou posted most of the source code for MyIE on his bulletin board system before leaving the project in 2000. Chen then continued independently developing MyIE and in 2002 released a new version, MyIE2. Users around the world were quite active in contributing to MyIE2's development, adding many plug-ins, skins and assisting with debugging. MyIE2 was renamed Maxthon in 2003.

Maxthon 2 was introduced in July 2007, and Maxthon 3 was released in September 2010. Later that year, Maxthon began introducing browsers for portable devices. In December, Maxthon for Android was released. On July 7, 2012, Maxthon for Mac was released, with Maxthon for iPhone and iPad released in August 2012. On December 10, 2012, Maxthon Cloud Browser, also named Maxthon 4, was released.

=== Features ===
Maxthon 5 introduced these features:

- UUMail: enhances the email experience by creating unlimited virtual email IDs to keep the real email address safe and filtering out spam to make sure the inbox stays clean and organized.
- Maxnote: the original 'Favorites' feature upgraded to 'Maxnote'. Users can collect everything, read anywhere, and record anytime.
- Passkeeper: help users remember all passwords securely. Synced users passwords to the Cloud and then accessed on all different platforms & allows people to add and edit "Accounts" and "Private Notes". It also helps users to auto-generate random complicated passwords when registering on a website so there's no need to worry about passwords being cracked anymore.

== Browser versions ==
=== Version 1.x ===
Maxthon version 1, which continued version 0 of MyIE2, was an Internet Explorer shell that implemented a tabbed browser using the Trident web browser engine which Microsoft introduced with Internet Explorer 4. As such, version 1 was compatible with every version of Windows from Windows 95 to Windows 7. Development of version 1 stopped in 2010 with the so-called Maxthon (Classic), version 1.6.7.35; earlier releases are available from Maxthon, and version 1.6.7.35, which fixed a bug in selecting the default search engine, is still available at other download sites.

There are many add-ons available for Maxthon Classic, and more are available through discussion forums. Specific threads may provide direct download links also. Some add-ons are build-specific, but in that case, a clear indication of compatibility can often be found.

Maxthon 1.3.1 brought cloud-based service for online syncing bookmarks (favorites) in 2005.

=== Version 2.x ===
Maxthon Browser 2 is a multi-tab browser released in July 2007. A later modification in 2008 was the first browser on the market to offer cloud-based services for syncing bookmarks and history. Version 2.x also blocks malicious plug-ins to prevent pop-ups and floating ads, and supports a variety of plug-in tools and IE extensions. It also supports a wide variety of skins and is customizable. New features included:

- Maxthon Passport: once the user signs in and registers for free membership, avatar remains in that space for future visits
- Multi Tab Manager: right-clicking on the 'Tab menu' brings up a function intended to make browsing and other operations more efficient.
- Mouse Gestures: right clicking and performing gestures with the mouse allows users to trigger customizable actions.
- Maxthon Smart Accelerator: the built-in is intended to increase browsing speed; see icon at Maxthon status bar.
- Autofill: automatically saves content entered into web forms and fills them automatically in the future.
- Undo list: after closing a webpage accidentally, the Undo button and Undo can restore it. All closed pages and browsing history are recorded in Undo list.
- Online Favorites: registering as a Maxthon Passport member allows instant access to cloud syncing services like online favorites.
- Super Drag and Drop: users can drag and drop selected text for a web search in their default search engine, or a selected link or image to open in a new tab.
- URL alias: through 'tab right click menu,' users can assign a 'special-sticky name' to a webpage, which can be entered in the address bar to open the corresponding webpage. Naming is possible through the right click tab menu.
- Super agent: supports adoption of HTTP, HTTPS, Socks4, Socks4a, Socks5, and other internet connection proxies, and also supports proxy that require authentication. By setting the Advanced Proxy Rule, the browser can automatically switch to different proxy servers.
- External Tools: users can add commonly used (i.e., possibly IE compatible only) tools and software shortcuts to their browser. The software can be set to start up and shut down with the browser.
- Web Toolbar: provides users with a set of commonly used small features. Among them, The Maxthon website aggregates many entertainment and social networking sites.
- AD blocking: through the menu "Webpage Content Block," Ad Hunter can block pop-ups, ads and malicious web harassment. Supports customizable filters.
- URL Key: through settings center, set an URL Key and press a function key to open one or more URLs.
- Web Sniffer: Web sniffer can capture FLV media files from video sites, allowing for download and saving. Users can also customize the type of files to sniff for.
- Screen Capture: users can arbitrarily snap a whole page, a region, a specified window and page content to the clipboard. Users can also configure the saving path and file format of the screenshot through setting options.
- Maxthon Download: without having to call other download programs, using the browser's built-in download can complete numbers of small download tasks. The download manager has several features.
- Plug-ins (Extensions): plug-ins can be used or programmed and shared with other users

=== Version 3.x ===
Maxthon 3 was released in the fall of 2010, after a beta period of 8 months. It has two layout engines: WebKit and Trident. New features included:

- Dual Display Engines: Maxthon uses the Ultra Mode, powered by the WebKit web browser engine, by default. It will switch automatically to Retro Mode, powered by the Trident engine, as needed to display older-style Web pages.
- Mouse Gesture: allows navigating through the web by moving a mouse in patterns that tell the browser to go back, forward, refresh, or hide.
- Super Drag & Drop: allows drag and drop to open new pages and images or perform a web search.
- Smart Address Bar: allows searching by typing keywords directly into address bar
- Magic Fill: Maxthon securely saves names and passwords of visited websites, then fills in that information on return.
- AD Hunter: removes advertisements with one click and automatically blocks pop-up windows.
- Maxthon Passport: once a user signs in and registers for free membership, avatar remains in that space for future visits.
- Online Favorites: registering as a Maxthon Passport member allows instant access to cloud syncing services like online favorites.
- Multi Search: after selecting this, a user can input keywords in the address or search bar, and it shows what multiple search engines return for the query.

=== Maxthon Cloud Browser ===
Also named Maxthon Cloud, Maxthon 4 was released on December 10, 2012. At the same time it released Passport and its cloud features. Maxthon Passport allowed users to sign-in and register for free membership, and their avatar remains in that space for future visits. Registering also gives users access to cloud syncing services like online favorites. New features include:

- Cloud Push: supports sending text, images, websites/links and tabs to Mac, Android and Windows operating systems.
- Cloud Share: supports sharing text, images, websites/links and files online.
- Cloud Download: supports downloading files in various formats and uploading them to My Cloud for backup on any device.
- My Cloud Tabs: lets users remember previous sessions, by automatically syncing tabs to Android, iOS, or Windows devices.
- Cloud Sync: Syncs account data (Favorites, Settings and Magic Fill data) to other devices.
- Reader Mode: adjusts font sizes and removes ads on articles for visibility, with a "night mode" option for low light.
- Magic Fill: Maxthon securely saves names and passwords of visited websites, then fills in that information upon return.
- Ad Hunter: removes advertisements with one click, and automatically blocks pop-up windows.
- New Session: users and gamers can simultaneously log into the same website with different accounts.
- Source Sniffer: extract all photos, embedded videos and audio files from a web page and download them.
- SkyNote: save and access text notes anywhere, and sync them across Windows and Android.
- Do Not Track: privacy from ad networks and beacons.
- Google Safe Browsing: identifies websites and warns if they are not safe and not secure before visiting.
- Privacy mode: disables browsing history.

=== MXNitro ===
On September 15, 2014, Maxthon released a beta version of a Windows web browser made for those with slow computers or internet connections. The browser fetched pages 3 times faster than other browsers. The browser had a clutter-free, intuitive look and feel designed expressly to make new users feel comfortable on first use. The browser never came out of beta.

=== Version 5.x ===
Maxthon 5 (also known as MX5) was released in October 2016. In the 5.2.x versions, the core of the browser is updated to the Chromium 61 branch point which suggests that the core is using Blink, a fork of WebKit. Aside from a series of new added and improved features, Maxthon 5 also introduces a few major built in functions, such as Maxnote as "your collecting button for the web", Passkeeper as "your smart password manager", and UUMail as "the guardian of your inbox". Through this new version, Maxthon 5 is aiming to become an information assistant for users. New features included:

- UUMail: enhances the email experience by creating unlimited virtual email IDs to keep the real email address safe and filtering out spams to make sure the inbox stays clean and organized.
- Maxnote: the original 'Favorites' feature upgraded to 'Maxnote'. Users can collect everything, read anywhere, and record anytime.
- Passkeeper: help users remember all passwords securely and smartly. Synced users passwords to the Cloud and then accessed on all different platforms & allows people to add and edit "Accounts" and "Private Notes". It also helps users to auto-generate random complicated passwords when registering on a website so there's no need to worry about passwords being cracked anymore.
- Customization: support customization for proxy and core switch button, UEIP data feedback in setting-Privacy & Content, and auto-sync setting
- External Tool: support external tool
- Guest Mode: add guest mode
- Interception: add popup window interception prompt
- New Favorite Method: support dragging URL in a webpage to shortcut bar and make it favorite
- Shortcut bar: add "add to this folder" for a folder in shortcut bar, support dragging to manage and organize entries, and support "delete" to recycle bin
- Traffic Calculation: add upload traffic calculation in Infobox-menu

=== Version 6.x ===
Maxthon 6 (MX6) was released on 30 November 2020, with regular beta updates since. It claims to be the default browser for 670 million users. Some Maxthon 5 features are not (yet) supported. The browser has an emphasis on blockchain technologies, and offers 64-bit and 32-bit versions on Windows, as well as iOS, Android and portable versions.

With the official release of Version 6.1.0.2000 Maxthon moved to a Chromium base, but still support the dual Trident and Blink rendering engines.

==== For Mac ====
In July 2012, Maxthon Cloud Browser for macOS was released. It allows Mac users with a Maxthon Passport account to keep all user data in sync across different devices and operating systems. New features include:

- Cloud Push: supports sending text, images, websites/links and tabs to Mac, Android and Windows operating systems.
- Cloud Share: supports sharing text, images, websites/links and files with other people.
- Cloud Download: supports downloading files in various formats and uploading them to 'My Cloud' for backup on any device.
- My Cloud Tabs: lets users remember previous sessions, by automatically syncing tabs to Android, iOS, or Windows devices.
- Cloud Sync: allows syncing of bookmarks, favorites, and other content across Windows, Mac and Android devices.
- Super Drag and Drop: allows user to highlight a URL or webpage text, then drag and drop into the address bar to open a new page or execute a web search.
- Mouse Gesture: allows simple shape creation with the mouse, and trigger commands like Refresh, Close Tab, Page Top/Down and Previous/Next Tab.
- Extension Center: company supported feature for finding browser extensions, compatible with Google Chrome extensions.
- Do Not Track: privacy from ad networks and beacons.
- Adobe Flash support pre-installed in software.
- Full user data encryption for security.

=== Maxthon Mobile ===
==== For Android ====
Maxthon Mobile for Android, a version for Android phones, was first released in 2010, followed in 2011 by a version optimized for 10 inch tablets. New features in 2012 included:

- Cloud Push: supports sending text, images, websites/links and tabs to Mac, Android and Windows operating systems.
- Cloud Share: supports sharing text, images, websites/links and files online
- Cloud Download: supports downloading files in various formats and uploading them to 'My Cloud' for backup on any device.
- Cloud Tabs: lets users remember previous sessions, by automatically syncing tabs to Android, iOS, or Windows devices.
- Sync Bookmarks/Favorites: sync bookmarks across Windows, iOS, and Mac devices.
- Full screen browsing
- App Center: function to find and group web apps and content.
- Super Gesture:: allows the use of gestures to create, close, switch, and restore tabs.
- Read-Ahead: preloads pages automatically.
- Reader Mode: adjusts font sizes and removes ads on articles for visibility, with a "night mode" option for low light

Version 6.x (2020) is also available for Android - see above.

==== For iOS ====
Maxthon Mobile for iOS was launched in July 2012, for iPhone, iPad, and iOS universal. Maxthon Cloud Browser for iOS saves and syncs key settings, content and features for users across multiple platforms and other devices. Mouse gestures can control the opening and switching between tabs. New features include:

- Cloud Push: supports sending text, images, websites/links and tabs to Mac, Android and Windows operating systems.
- Cloud Share: supports sharing text, images, websites/links and files online
- Cloud Download: supports downloading files in various formats and uploading them to 'My Cloud' for backup on any device.
- Cloud Tabs: lets users remember previous sessions, by automatically syncing tabs to Android, iOS, or Windows devices.
- Sync Bookmarks/Favorites: works across Windows, Mac and iOS devices.
- Reader Mode: adjusts font sizes and removes ads on articles for visibility, with a "night mode" option for low light
- Brightness Control: adjust screen brightness within the browser.
- Portrait Orientation Lock: supports switching the screen orientation in Maxthon Browser.
- Privacy Protection: allows browsing without tracking
- New User Interface: full-screen browsing mode.

Version 6.x (2020) is also available for iOS - see above.

==== For Windows Phone ====
Maxthon Mobile for Windows Phone was launched in October 2013. The features that were included in this version were:

- Cloud services with multi-device support
- Ease of use with (patent-pending) implementation of tabs
- Favorites optimized for mobile touch screens
- Live tiles in Quick Access
- Pop-up address bar

== See also ==
- List of web browsers
- Comparison of web browsers
