= Netscape Composer =

Computer software

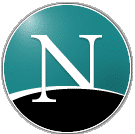

- Netscape Composer 7
- Developers: Netscape, AOL
- Release: 1997; 29 years ago
- Stable release: 7.2 (August 17, 2004) [±]
- Available in: English
- Type: HTML editor
- Website: browser.netscape.com/downloads/archive/

Netscape Composer is a discontinued WYSIWYG HTML editor initially developed by Netscape Communications Corporation in 1997, and packaged as part of the Netscape Communicator, Netscape 6 and Netscape 7 range of Internet suites. In addition, Composer can also view and edit HTML code, preview pages in Netscape Navigator, check spelling, publish websites, and supports most major types of formatting.

== Development ==
Composer was initially developed by Netscape as a improved, modernized version of the HTML editor within Netscape Navigator Gold 3.0. It was later made a component of the Netscape Communicator Internet suite. After the company was bought by AOL in 1998, further development of its codebase was made open source and overseen by the Mozilla Foundation. Subsequent releases of Netscape Composer were based upon Mozilla Composer, the same utility within the Mozilla Application Suite.

The last version of Netscape Composer was released with the Netscape 7.2 suite. It was not included with later releases, as Mozilla decided to focus on stand-alone applications, and as such, Netscape released the stand-alone browsers Netscape Browser 8 in 2005 and Netscape Navigator 9 in 2007, both based upon the stand-alone Mozilla Firefox.

SeaMonkey, the community-driven successor suite to Mozilla Application Suite and the Netscape suites, features an HTML editor named Composer that is developed from Mozilla Composer. Nvu, KompoZer, and BlueGriffon are separate editor projects derived from Composer; all have been discontinued.

== Reception ==
Mark Gibbs of Network World was generally negative about Composer, noting its lack of support for web forms, website monitoring tools, and image maps. He also called the online help system "amateurish" and "eccentric". Maggie Biggs of sister publication InfoWorld on the other hand praised Composer for its ease of use and versatility. PC Magazine's Edward Mendelson wrote that Composer was "easy-to-use ... but just like Navigator and every other browser, it's designed to work with single pages, not to manage sites". He concluded: "If you already use Navigator and need to create a few HTML pages, Composer will get the job done easily and quickly".

== See also ==
- List of HTML editors
