= Netscape Mail & Newsgroups =

Email and news client software

Netscape Mail and Newsgroups
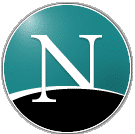

- Netscape Mail 7
- Developer: Netscape
- Release: 2.0 (September 1995)
- Final release: 7.2 (August 17, 2004) [±]
- Preview release: n/a [±]
- Written in: C, C++
- Operating system: Cross-platform
- Available in: English
- Type: E-mail and news client

Netscape Mail and Newsgroups, commonly known as just Netscape Mail, was an email and news client produced by Netscape Communications Corporation as part of the Netscape series of suites between versions 2.0 to 7.2. In the 2.x and 3.x series, it was bundled with the web browser. In the 4.x series, it was rewritten as two separate programs known as Netscape Messenger and Netscape Collabra.

== Features ==
Netscape Mail & Newsgroups features support for relevant protocols such as IMAP, POP3 and SMTP, a built-in Bayesian spam filter, support for multiple accounts, etc. Released in 1995, it was the first mail reader (or Usenet reader) to support native display of HTML messages.

Initially its development was overseen in-house, but following AOL's purchase of Netscape in 1998, its codebase development was handed over to the Mozilla Foundation, originally initiated by Netscape, and therefore became based upon the Mozilla Mail & Newsgroups component of the open-source Mozilla Application Suite. Mozilla ceased development of the suite between 2004 and 2006 in favour of stand-alone applications, and as a consequence Netscape's series of suites were also discontinued. In 2005, Netscape released Netscape Browser 8, based upon Mozilla Firefox, which did not include an email client, therefore the latest version inclusive of a mail client, version 7.2, became unsupported.

The development of Mozilla Mail and Newsgroups has now been continued as SeaMonkey Mail and Newsgroups.

== Re-generation ==
In 2007, after the release of stand-alone browser Netscape Navigator 9, Netscape confirmed that it would once again develop an e-mail client, now named Netscape Messenger 9. The new release was to be based upon Mozilla Mail's successor, Mozilla Thunderbird.

Additionally, after an official poll posted on Netscape's community support board in late 2006, speculation arose of the Netscape 7 series of suites (including the Mail client) being fully supported and updated by Netscape's in-house development team once more, including major bug fixes and security issues.

However, development of Netscape Messenger (and any speculation of an update of Netscape 7) was ended when AOL announced they would end development and support of Netscape Navigator and Netscape Messenger. Support ended on March 1, 2008.

== See also ==
- Netscape Messenger 9
- Mozilla Mail & Newsgroups
- Netscape 7
- Netscape Navigator 2
- Netscape (web browser)
- SeaMonkey
- Mozilla Thunderbird
