= Netscape Navigator =

Web browser by Netscape released in 1994

- Netscape Navigator 1.22
- Developer: Netscape
- Release: 15 December 1994; 31 years ago
- Final release: 9.0.0.6 (February 20, 2008; 18 years ago) [±]
- Type: Web browser

Netscape Navigator was a brand of web browsers first developed and sold by Netscape Communications Corporation in 1994 that was progressively developed until its discontinuation in the late 1990s before the brand was briefly revived for the release of Netscape Navigator 9 under AOL in 2007. It was the flagship product of the Netscape Communications Corporation and was the dominant web browser in terms of usage share in the 1990s, but by around 2003 its user base had all but disappeared. This was partly because Microsoft bundled Internet Explorer with the Windows operating system.

The business demise of Netscape was a central premise of Microsoft's antitrust trial, wherein the Court ruled that Microsoft's bundling of Internet Explorer with the Windows operating system was a monopolistic and illegal business practice. The decision came too late for Netscape, however, as Internet Explorer had by then become the dominant web browser for Windows.

Initially a standalone product, the Netscape Navigator browser was incorporated into the Netscape Communicator internet suite in 1997.

After primary development of the browser engine transitioned to the open source Mozilla project, which included a rewrite of the engine source code, the Netscape Navigator brand name returned in 2007 when AOL announced Netscape Navigator 9. On December 28, 2007, AOL canceled its development but continued supporting the web browser with security updates until March 1, 2008. AOL allows downloading of archived versions of the Netscape Navigator web browser family.

== History and development ==
=== Origin ===
Mosaic Netscape 0.9, a preview version, with image of the Mozilla mascot, and the Mosaic logo in the top-right corner

Netscape Navigator was inspired by the success of NCSA Mosaic, which was co-written by Marc Andreessen, a part-time employee of the National Center for Supercomputing Applications at the University of Illinois. After Andreessen graduated in 1993, he moved to California and there met Jim Clark, the recently departed founder of Silicon Graphics. Clark believed that the Mosaic browser had great commercial possibilities and provided the seed money. Soon Mosaic Communications Corporation was in business in Mountain View, California, with Andreessen as a vice-president. Since the University of Illinois was unhappy with the company's use of the Mosaic name, the company changed its name to Netscape Communications (suggested by product manager Greg Sands) and named its flagship web browser Netscape Navigator.

Netscape announced in its first press release (October 13, 1994) that it would make Navigator available without charge to all non-commercial users, and beta versions of version 1.0 and 1.1 were freely downloadable in November 1994 and March 1995, with the full version 1.0 available in December 1994. However, two months later, the company announced that only educational and non-profit institutions could use version 1.0 at no charge.

The reversal was complete with the availability of version 1.1 beta on March 6, 1995, in which a press release states that the final 1.1 release would be available at no cost only for academic and non-profit organizational use.

The first few releases of the product were made available in "commercial" and "evaluation" versions; for example, version "1.0" and version "1.0N". The "N" evaluation versions were identical to the commercial versions; the letter was intended as a reminder to people to pay for the browser once they felt they had tried it long enough and were satisfied with it. This distinction was formally dropped within a year of the initial release, and the full version of the browser continued to be made available for free online, with boxed versions available on floppy disks (and later CDs) in stores along with a period of phone support. During this era, "Internet Starter Kit" books were popular, and usually included a floppy disk or CD containing internet software, and this was a popular means of obtaining Netscape's and other browsers. Email support was initially free and remained so for a year or two until the volume of support requests grew too high.

During development, the Netscape browser was known by the code name Mozilla, which became the name of a Godzilla-like cartoon dragon mascot used prominently on the company's website. The Mozilla name was also used as the User-Agent in HTTP requests by the browser. Other web browsers claimed to be compatible with Netscape's extensions to HTML and therefore used the same name in their User-Agent identifiers so that web servers would send them the same pages as were sent to Netscape browsers. Mozilla is now a generic name for matters related to the open source successor to Netscape Communicator and is most identified with the browser Firefox.

=== Rise ===
When the consumer Internet revolution arrived in the mid-1990s, Netscape was well-positioned to take advantage of it and the influx of new users it brought. With a good mix of features and an attractive licensing scheme that allowed free use for non-commercial purposes, the Netscape browser soon became the de facto standard, particularly on the Windows platform. Internet service providers and computer magazine publishers helped make Navigator readily available.

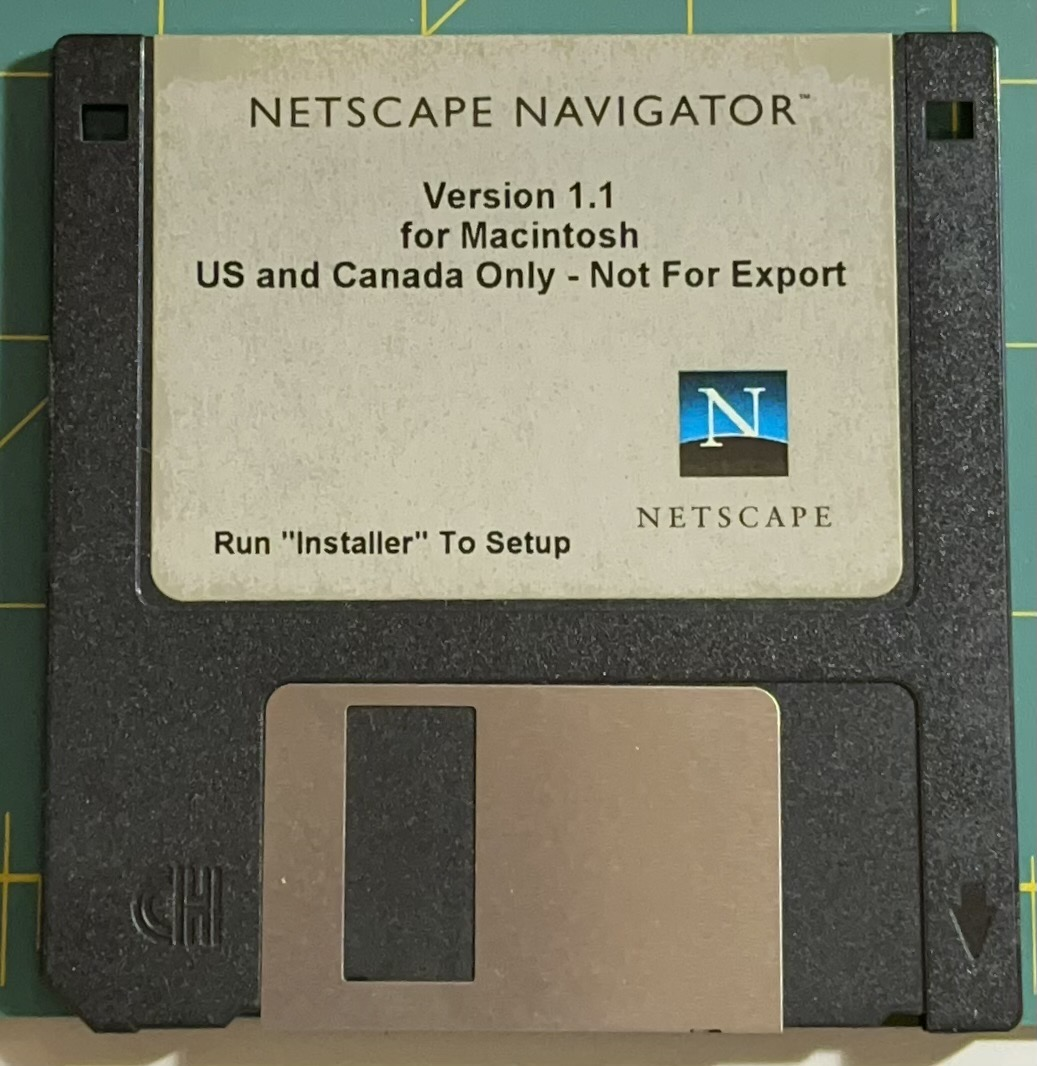
A floppy disk of Netscape Navigator for Macintosh systems.

An innovation that Netscape introduced in 1994 was the on-the-fly display of web pages, where text and graphics appeared on the screen as the web page downloaded. Earlier web browsers would not display a page until all graphics on it had been loaded over the network connection; this meant a user might have only a blank page for several minutes. With Netscape, people using dial-up connections could begin reading the text of a web page within seconds of entering a web address, even before the rest of the text and graphics had finished downloading. This made the web much more tolerable to the average user.

Through the late 1990s, Netscape made sure that Navigator remained the technical leader among web browsers. New features included cookies, frames, proxy auto-config, and JavaScript (in version 2.0). Although those and other innovations eventually became open standards of the W3C and ECMA and were emulated by other browsers, they were often viewed as controversial. Netscape, according to critics, was more interested in bending the web to its own de facto "standards" (bypassing standards committees and thus marginalizing the commercial competition) than it was in fixing bugs in its products. Consumer rights advocates were particularly critical of cookies and of commercial websites using them to invade individual privacy.

In the marketplace, however, these concerns made little difference. Netscape Navigator remained the market leader with more than 50% usage share. Navigator releases were supported on a wide range of operating systems, including Windows (3.1, 95, 98, NT), Macintosh, Linux, OS/2, and many versions of Unix including OSF/1, Sun Solaris, BSD/OS, IRIX, AIX, and HP-UX, and looked and worked nearly identically on every one of them. Netscape began to experiment with prototypes of a web-based system, known internally as "Constellation", which would allow users to access and edit their files anywhere across a network, no matter what computer or operating system they happened to be using.

Industry observers forecast the dawn of a new era of connected computing. The underlying operating system, it was believed, would not be an important consideration; future applications would run within a web browser. This was seen by Netscape as a clear opportunity to entrench Navigator at the heart of the next generation of computing, and thus gain the opportunity to expand into all manner of other software and service markets.

=== Decline ===
Usage share of Netscape Navigator, 1994–2007

With the success of Netscape showing the importance of the web (more people were using the Internet due in part to the ease of using Netscape), Internet browsing began to be seen as a potentially profitable market. Following Netscape's lead, Microsoft started a campaign to enter the web browser software market. Like Netscape before them, Microsoft licensed the Mosaic source code from Spyglass, Inc. (which in turn licensed code from University of Illinois). Using this basic code, Microsoft created Internet Explorer (IE).

The competition between Microsoft and Netscape dominated the browser wars. Internet Explorer, Version 1.0 (shipped in the Internet Jumpstart Kit in Microsoft Plus! For Windows 95) and IE, Version 2.0 (the first cross-platform version of the web browser, supporting both Windows and Mac OS) were thought by many to be inferior and primitive when compared to contemporary versions of Netscape Navigator. With the release of IE version 3.0 (1996), Microsoft was able to catch up with Netscape competitively, with IE Version 4.0 (1997) further improving in terms of market share. IE 5.0 (1999) improved stability and took significant market share from Netscape Navigator for the first time.

There were two versions of Netscape Navigator 3.0, the Standard Edition and the Gold Edition. The latter consisted of the Navigator browser with e-mail, news readers, and a WYSIWYG web page compositor. Version 2.0 of Navigator Gold, released in 1996, was the first HTML editor capable of editing JavaScript. These extra functions enlarged and slowed the software, rendering it prone to crashing, however.

This Gold Edition was renamed Netscape Communicator starting with version 4.0; the name change diluted its name-recognition and confused users. Netscape CEO James L. Barksdale insisted on the name change because Communicator was a general-purpose client application, which contained the Navigator browser.

The aging Netscape Communicator 4.x was slower than Internet Explorer 5.0. Typical web pages had become heavily illustrated, often JavaScript-intensive, and encoded with HTML features designed for specific purposes but now employed as global layout tools (HTML tables, the most obvious example of this, were especially difficult for Communicator to render). The Netscape browser, once a solid product, became crash-prone and buggy; for example, some versions re-downloaded an entire web page to re-render it when the browser window was re-sized (a nuisance to dial-up users), and the browser would usually crash when the page contained simple Cascading Style Sheets, as proper support for CSS never made it into Communicator 4.x. At the time that Communicator 4.0 was being developed, Netscape had a competing technology called JavaScript Style Sheets. Near the end of the development cycle, it became obvious that CSS would prevail, so Netscape quickly implemented a CSS to JSSS converter, which then processed CSS as JSSS (this is why turning JavaScript off also disabled CSS). Moreover, Netscape Communicator's browser interface design appeared dated in comparison to Internet Explorer and interface changes in Microsoft and Apple's operating systems.

By the end of the decade, Netscape's web browser had lost dominance over the Windows platform, and the August 1997 Microsoft financial agreement to invest $150 million in Apple Computer required that Apple make Internet Explorer the default web browser in new Mac OS distributions. The latest IE Mac release at that time was Internet Explorer version 3.0 for Macintosh, but Internet Explorer 4 was released later that year.

Microsoft succeeded in having ISPs and PC vendors distribute Internet Explorer to their customers instead of Netscape Navigator, mostly due to Microsoft using its leverage from Windows OEM licenses, and partly aided by Microsoft's investment in making IE brandable, such that a customized version of IE could be offered. Also, web developers used proprietary, browser-specific extensions in web pages. Both Microsoft and Netscape did this, having added many proprietary HTML tags to their browsers, which forced users to choose between two competing and almost incompatible web browsers.

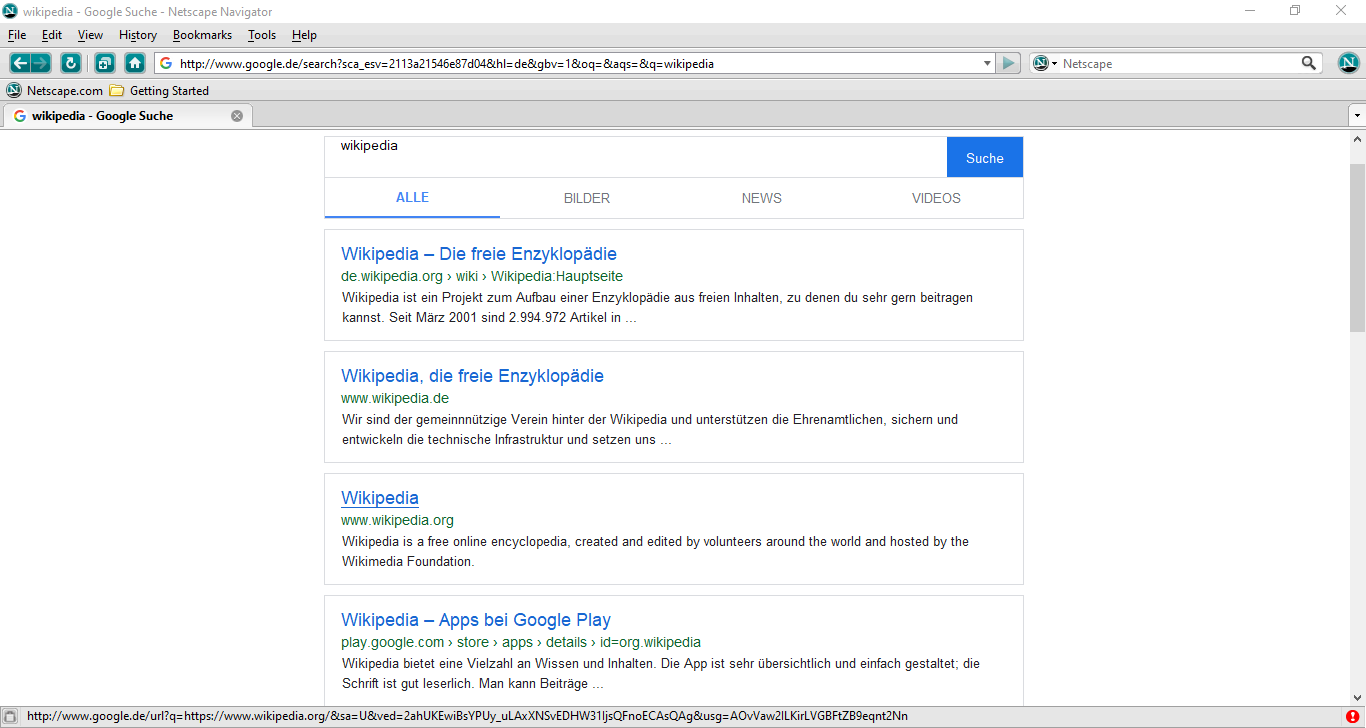
Netscape v. 9.0.0.6 with Google search results of "Wikipedia"

In March 1998, Netscape released most of the development code base for Netscape Communicator under an open source license. Only pre-alpha versions of Netscape 5 were released before the open source community decided to scrap the Netscape Navigator codebase entirely and build a new web browser around the Gecko layout engine which Netscape had been developing but which had not yet incorporated. The community-developed open source project was named Mozilla, Netscape Navigator's original code name. America Online bought Netscape; Netscape programmers took a pre-beta-quality form of the Mozilla codebase, gave it a new GUI, and released it as Netscape 6. This did nothing to win back users, who continued to migrate to Internet Explorer. After the release of Netscape 7 and a long public beta test, Mozilla 1.0 was released on June 5, 2002. The same code-base, notably the Gecko layout engine, became the basis of independent applications, including Firefox and Thunderbird.

On December 28, 2007, the Netscape developers announced that AOL had canceled development of Netscape Navigator, leaving it unsupported as of March 1, 2008. Archived and unsupported versions of the browser remain available for download.

== Legacy ==
Netscape's contributions to the web include JavaScript, which was submitted as a new standard to Ecma International. The resultant ECMAScript specification allowed JavaScript support by multiple web browsers and its use as a cross-browser scripting language, long after Netscape Navigator itself had dropped in popularity. Another example is the FRAME tag, which is widely supported today, and has been incorporated into official web standards such as the "HTML 4.01 Frameset" specification.

In a 2007 PC World column, the original Netscape Navigator was considered the "best tech product of all time" due to its impact on the Internet.

== See also ==
- Comparison of web browsers
- History of the World Wide Web
- List of web browsers
- Lou Montulli
- Timeline of web browsers

Preceded by first	Netscape Navigator (1-4.08)	Succeeded by Netscape Communicator (4)
