= Netscape 7 =

Discontinued internet suite

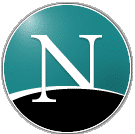

- Netscape 7.2 under Windows
- Developer(s): AOL
- Initial release: August 29, 2002; 22 years ago
- Final release: 7.2 / 17 August 2004
- Preview release: 7.0 PR1 / 23 May 2002
- Written in: ?
- Operating system: Cross-platform
- Predecessor: Netscape 6
- Successor: Netscape Browser
- Type: Internet suite

Netscape 7 is a discontinued Internet suite developed by Netscape Communications Corporation, and was the seventh major release of the Netscape series of browsers. It is the successor of Netscape 6, and was developed in-house by AOL. It was released on August 29, 2002 and is based on Mozilla Application Suite 1.0.

The browser in Netscape 7 was originally superseded by Netscape Browser (version 8) in 2005, which like its name suggests was simply a web browser and not a full Internet suite. Netscape 7's Mail & Newsgroups client was succeeded by Netscape Messenger 9 in 2007.

As of version 7.2, it consisted of the following major components:

- a web browser
- an e-mail and news client, Netscape Mail & Newsgroups
- an address book
- a HTML editor, Netscape Composer
- an IRC client
- an instant messaging client, AOL Instant Messenger
- Radio@Netscape

== History and development ==
Netscape 7.0 was released in 2002. It was based on a more stable and notably faster Mozilla 1.0 core and bundled with extras like integrated AOL Instant Messenger, integrated ICQ, Radio@Netscape, and new features such as tabbed browsing. The market responded to what was essentially a repackaged version of Mozilla Application Suite (swollen with integrated tools to access proprietary services owned by AOL) by ignoring it (partly because the initial Netscape 7.0 release removed the popup blocker from Mozilla). Competition from mature and competent non-Microsoft alternatives such as the Opera browser and the regular Mozilla distribution was a major factor. A point release of version 7.1 (based on Mozilla 1.4) was similarly ignored.

AOL announced on July 15, 2003 that it was laying off all its remaining development staff working on the Netscape version of Mozilla. Combined with AOL's antitrust case court settlement with Microsoft to use Internet Explorer in future versions of the AOL software, this seemed to mark the effective end of development on Netscape Navigator, the open source projects notwithstanding. Many believed that no further versions of the browser would be released and that the Netscape brand name would live on only as the name of AOL's low-cost dial-up internet service.

Netscape 7.2 was released on August 17, 2004, though AOL did not restart the Netscape browser division (instead, they developed it in-house). It was very similar to Netscape 7.1 and the only new feature in it was the Netscape Toolbar, which was developed by mozdev.org.

Though many had believed Netscape 7 would be the last version of Netscape to be released, AOL, in May 2005, released Netscape Browser version 8. It included improved security and the ability to natively use the Gecko layout engine used by Mozilla and its derivatives. It also has Internet Explorer's Trident as a possible rendering engine to use, which enables the user to switch to its rendering system to display web pages that do not work well with Gecko. This use of the Trident engine allows the use of ActiveX controls and brings all ActiveX security problems associated with Internet Explorer.

Netscape 9 superseded Netscape 8 in October 2007, but Netscape's browser was discontinued altogether on March 1, 2008.

=== Release history ===
- Netscape 7.0 PR1 – Preview Release 1
- Netscape 7.0 – August 29, 2002 (based on Mozilla 1.0.1)
- Netscape 7.01 – December 10, 2002 (based on Mozilla 1.0.2)
- Netscape 7.02 – February 18, 2003 (based on Mozilla 1.0.2)
- Netscape 7.1 – June 30, 2003 (based on Mozilla 1.4)
- Netscape 7.2 – August 17, 2004 (based on Mozilla 1.7)

== See also ==
- Netscape
- Mozilla Application Suite

Preceded by Netscape 6	Netscape 7	Succeeded by Netscape Browser (8)
