= Mozilla Mail & Newsgroups =

E-mail and news client

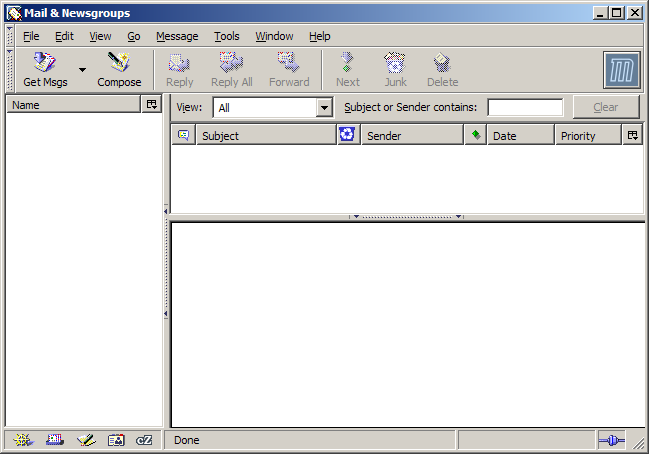
The main windows of Mail & Newsgroups, a component of the Mozilla Application Suite, version 1.7.13, running on Windows XP.

Mozilla Mail & Newsgroups (also referred to as Mozilla Mail/News or simply Mozilla Mail) was an e-mail and news client that was part of the Mozilla Application Suite.

Mozilla Mail & Newsgroups featured e.g. support for relevant protocols such as IMAP, POP3 and SMTP, a built-in Bayesian spam filter, support for multiple accounts, etc. The feature set was mostly comparable with that of the stand-alone alternative, Mozilla Thunderbird. This was because the two applications shared the same codebase for most things except the user interface.

Mozilla Application Suite has been superseded by SeaMonkey and the email and news client is now SeaMonkey Mail & Newsgroups. A re-packaged version of Mozilla Mail and Newsgroups was also included in Netscape versions 6 and 7, known as Netscape Mail & Newsgroups, and also appears in Classilla.

== See also ==
- Mozilla Thunderbird
- List of Usenet newsreaders
- Comparison of Usenet newsreaders
