= Netscape (web browser) =

Family of web browsers

- Netscape Navigator 9.0 displaying the Main Page of the English Wikipedia in 2007
- Developers: Netscape Communications; AOL
- Release: October 13, 1994; 32 years ago
- Type: Web browser
- License: Proprietary software
- Website: No current dedicated website (Note: Download site is isp.netscape.com (in footer)), formerly: https://www.browser.netscape.com/, (archived here)

A/UX running Netscape

The Netscape web browser is the general name for a series of web browsers formerly produced by Netscape Communications Corporation, which eventually became a subsidiary of AOL. The original browser was once the dominant browser in terms of usage share, but as a result of the first browser war, it lost virtually all of its share to Internet Explorer due to Microsoft's anti-competitive bundling of Internet Explorer with Windows.

Netscape was discontinued, and support for all Netscape browsers and client products was terminated on March 1, 2008.

In 2024, AOL created a web browser using the Netscape name. This is a Chromium fork which appears to be a reskinned version of AOL Shield Pro.

== Timeline and history ==
=== Netscape-based releases ===
==== Netscape Navigator (Versions 1.0 to 4.08) ====
A screenshot of Netscape 1.2 on Windows 3.1

Netscape Navigator was the name of Netscape's web browser from versions 1.0 through 4.08. The first version of the browser was released in 1994, known as Mosaic and then Mosaic Netscape until a legal challenge from the National Center for Supercomputing Applications (makers of NCSA Mosaic, which many of Netscape's founders had spent time developing), which led to the name change to Netscape Navigator. The company's name also changed from Mosaic Communications Corporation to Netscape Communications Corporation.

The browser was the most advanced available and was an instant success, becoming market leader while still in beta. Netscape's feature count and market share continued to grow rapidly after version 1.0 was released. Version 2.0 added a full mail reader called Netscape Mail, thus transforming Netscape from a mere web browser to an Internet suite. During this period, both the browser and the suite were known as Netscape Navigator. Around the same time, AOL started bundling its software with Microsoft's Internet Explorer.

Version 3.0 of Netscape was the first to face any serious competition in the form of Microsoft Internet Explorer 3.0, but Netscape held off Microsoft's challenge and remained the number one browser for the time. Version 3.0 was also available in a "Gold" version, which featured a WYSIWYG HTML editor (later added to Netscape Communicator as a standard feature), and was sold as retail software for profit. Netscape 3.0 introduced many new features, such as new plug-ins, background colors for tables, the archive attribute, and the applet element. Netscape Navigator 3 was the undisputed web browser giant in its time, with over 90% share, but it was later eroded by the free Internet Explorer included with Windows 95.

==== Netscape Communicator (Versions 4.5 to 4.8) ====
Netscape 4 addressed the problem of Netscape Navigator being used as both the name of the suite and the browser contained within it by renaming the suite to Netscape Communicator. After releasing five preview releases from 1996 to 1997, Netscape Corp. released the final version of Netscape Communicator in June 1997. This new version, more or less based on Netscape Navigator 3 Code, updated and added new features (such as support of certain CSS1 elements, minimal dynamic font support, and the proprietary object element). The new suite was successful, despite increasing competition from Internet Explorer 4.0 and problems with the outdated browser core. The Communicator suite was made up of Netscape Navigator, Netscape Mail and Newsgroups, Netscape Address Book, and Netscape Composer (an HTML editor, which later became Mozilla Composer and eventually was split off into a completely separate product, Nvu). In October 1998, version 4.5 of Netscape Communicator was released. This new version featured various functionality improvements, especially in the Mail/News component, but did not update the browser core (which, in its functionality, was basically identical to version 4.08). Only one month later, Netscape Communications Corporation was bought by AOL. A standalone version of Netscape Navigator was still available, but this was discontinued after version 4.08 for Windows. Standalone versions for other operating systems, such as Unix/Linux, were maintained up to version 4.8.

On January 22, 1998, Netscape Communications Corporation announced that all future versions of their software would be free of charge and developed by an Open Source Community (Mozilla). Netscape Communicator 5.0 was announced (codenamed "Gromit"). But there were significant delays to the release of Netscape's next major version and Communicator; therefore aged badly over the many years it was still used. As a result of this, and a more advanced support of HTML 4, CSS, DOM, and ECMAScript by Internet Explorer starting with version 4, the more up-to-date Internet Explorer 5.0 became the market leader. In November 1998, work on Netscape 5.0 was canceled in favor of developing a completely new program from scratch.

==== Netscape Communicator 5.0 (Canceled) ====
Netscape 5.0 (codenamed "Gromit") was a continuation of the 4.x code, but only two pre-alpha versions were written, one based on original Communicator code (with layout engine stability and performance enhancements to the 4.0 codebase, codenamed Mariner) and another using the Gecko layout engine.

Though Netscape had originally intended to deploy Mariner and later replace it with Gecko (which had been developed from scratch), Netscape 5 and Mariner were scrapped completely. However, the versions continued to be numbered as if they had been released.

Netscape formed the Mozilla Foundation and developed the Mozilla Application Suite using Gecko. The open-source Mozilla browser was in turn used as the basis for Netscape 6.

=== Mozilla Application Suite-based releases ===
==== Netscape 6 (Versions 6.0 to 6.2.3) ====
Netscape Navigator 6.1

In 1998, an informal group called the Mozilla Organization was formed and largely funded by Netscape (the vast majority of programmers working on the code were paid by Netscape) to coordinate the development of Netscape 5 (codenamed "Gromit"), which would be based on the Communicator source code. The aging Communicator code proved difficult to work with, and the decision was made in late October to drop the code branch of the Communicator 4.5 core rendering engine and start from scratch using the standards-compliant Gecko rendering engine. Gecko featured in the Mozilla web browser, which, with a few additions, Netscape 6 was based on.

This decision meant that Netscape's next major version was severely delayed. In the meantime, Netscape was taken over by AOL, which, acting under pressure from the Web Standards Project, forced its new division to release Netscape 6.0 in 2000. With public beta versions released in April, August, and October, Netscape 6.0 was released in November 2000.

The suite again consisted of Netscape Navigator and the other Communicator components, with the addition of a built-in AOL Instant Messenger client, branded as Netscape Instant Messenger. However, it was clear that Netscape 6 was not yet ready for release, and it flopped badly. It was based on Mozilla 0.6, which was not ready to be used by the general public yet due to many serious bugs that would cause it to crash often or render web pages slowly.

Later versions of Netscape 6 were much improved (6.2.x was regarded as an especially good release), but the browser still struggled to make an impact on a disappointed community.

==== Netscape 7 (Versions 7.0 to 7.2) ====
Netscape 7.0 (codenamed "Mach Five" and based on Mozilla 1.0.1) was released in August 2002 and was a direct continuation of Netscape 6 with very similar components. It picked up a few users, but was still very much a minority browser, one of the problems being that Mozilla itself was a worthy adversary. In addition, AOL had decided to deactivate Mozilla's pop-up blocker functionality in Netscape 7.0, which created outrage in the community. In response to the complaints, AOL integrated the pop-up blocker into Netscape 7.01. In addition, Netscape introduced a new AOL-free version (without the usual AOL addons) of the browser suite. Netscape 7.1 (codenamed "Buffy" and based on Mozilla 1.4) was released in June 2003.

In 2003, AOL closed down its Netscape division and laid off or reassigned all of Netscape's employees. Mozilla.org continued as the independent Mozilla Foundation, taking on many of Netscape's ex-employees. AOL continued to develop Netscape in-house, but due to there being no staff committed to it, improvements were minimal.

One year later, in August 2004, the last version based on Mozilla was released: Netscape 7.2, based on Mozilla 1.7.2.

=== Mozilla Firefox-based releases ===
==== Netscape Browser (Versions 8.0 to 8.1.3) ====
Netscape Browser 8.1.3

Between 2005 and 2007, Netscape's releases became known as Netscape Browser. AOL chose to base Netscape Browser on the relatively successful Mozilla Firefox, a rewritten version of Mozilla produced by the Mozilla Foundation. This release is not a full Internet suite as before, but is solely a web browser. Other controversial decisions include these versions being made only for Microsoft Windows and featuring both the Gecko rendering engine of previous releases and the Trident engine used in Internet Explorer.

AOL's acquisition of Netscape years earlier made it less of a surprise when the company laid off the Netscape team and outsourced development to Mercurial Communications.

Netscape Browser 8.1.3 was released on April 2, 2007, and included general bug fixes identified in versions 8.0–8.1.2

==== Netscape Navigator 9 (Version 9.0) ====
Netscape confirmed on 23 January 2007 that Netscape Browser versions 8.0–8.1.2 were to be succeeded by a new stand-alone browser release, Netscape Navigator 9. Its features were said to include newsfeed support and become more integrated with the Propeller Internet portal, alongside more enhanced methods of discussion, submission and voting on web pages. It also sees the browser return to multi-platform support across Windows, Linux and Mac OS X. Like Netscape version 8.x, the new release was based upon the popular Mozilla Firefox (version 2.0), and had full support of all Firefox add-ons and plugins, some of which Netscape provided. Also for the first time since 2004, the browser was produced in-house with its own programming staff.

A beta of the program was first released on 5 June 2007. The final version was released on October 15, 2007.

On December 28, 2007, Netscape developers announced that AOL would discontinue their web browser on February 1, 2008, due to low market share. On January 28, 2008, Netscape revised this date to March 1, 2008, and offered support for migration to Flock and Mozilla Firefox.

=== Chromium-based releases ===
In 2024, AOL and Yahoo! Inc. released a new version of Netscape Navigator based on Chromium. The current download link is at the bottom of the Netscape ISP homepage.

== Release compatibility ==
| Operating system | | Latest version |
|---|---|---|
| Mac OS | v9.x-10.0 | 7.0.2 (2003) |
| Mac OS | v10.1 | 7.2 (2004) |
| Mac OS | v10.2-10.5 | 9.0.0.6 (2008) |
| Microsoft Windows | 3.1 | 4.08 (1998) |
| Microsoft Windows | 95 | 6.2.3 (2002) |
| Microsoft Windows | 98 | 7.2 (2004) |
| Microsoft Windows | 98SE-Vista | 9.0.0.6 (2008) |
| Linux | Linux kernel 2.2.14 | 9.0.0.6 (2008) |

== Release history ==
Key:
| Internal Build | Old final version | Final version | Pre-release version |

| Browser Name | Series | Version | Based on | Release date | Notes |
|---|---|---|---|---|---|
| MCOM Mosaic | 0.x | 0.4 | Netscape | September 9, 1994 | First in-dev release |
| Mosaic NetScape | 0.x | 0.5 | Netscape | September 18, 1994 | In-dev release |
| Mosaic NetScape | 0.x | 0.6 | Netscape | September 26, 1994 | In-dev release (Private Beta by request) - "http://" prefix no longer needed when entering website address |
| Mosaic NetScape | 0.x | 0.7 | Netscape | October 1994 | In-dev release - New throbber and application icon; Stop button now only enabled during transfers |
| Mosaic NetScape | 0.x | 0.8 | Netscape | October 1994 | In-Dev Release |
| Mosaic NetScape | 0.x | 0.85 | Netscape | October 1994 | In-dev release, possibly only for X11 |
| Mosaic Netscape | 0.x | 0.9 | Netscape | October 13, 1994 | First public beta release - Added inline JPEG and cookie support. |
| Mosaic Netscape | 0.x | 0.91 | Netscape | October 1994 | In-Dev release |
| Mosaic Netscape | 0.x | 0.92 | Netscape | October 1994 | In-dev release - Windows keyboard back/forward shortcut changed to alt+left/right (from ctrl+left/right); support for p align parameter |
| Mosaic Netscape | 0.x | 0.93 | Netscape | November 1994 | In-dev release - First version with Security (RSA/SSL) enabled |
| Netscape Navigator | 0.x | 0.94 | Netscape | November 21, 1994 | In-Dev release |
| Netscape Navigator | 0.x | 0.96 | Netscape | December 7, 1994 | In-dev release - Throbber changed to 'N' |
| Netscape Navigator | 1.x | | | | |
| Netscape Navigator | 1.x | 1.0 | Netscape | December 15, 1994 | First non-beta release |
| Netscape Navigator | 1.x | 1.1 | Netscape | March 1995 | Added support for tables, background images, or colors. Throbber changed to 'N' on the hill. |
| Netscape Navigator | 1.x | 1.22 | Netscape | August 1995 | |
| Netscape Navigator | 2.x | 2.0 | Netscape | September 18, 1995 | Including JavaScript support, Java support, plug-ins, integrated Messenger/Collabra, Auto-dither, Live3D, support for font color, div, wrap, textarea tags, superscript/subscript, and Animated GIF |
| Netscape Navigator | 2.x | 2.01 | Netscape | March 18, 1996 | |
| Netscape Navigator | 2.x | 2.02 | Netscape | | |
| Netscape Navigator | 3.x | 3.0 | Netscape | August 19, 1996 | Added support for LiveAudio, LiveVideo, QuickTime, POP3, HTML 3.2 and extra tags. |
| Netscape Navigator | 3.x | 3.01 | Netscape | | |
| Netscape Navigator | 3.x | 3.02 | Netscape | | |
| Netscape Navigator | 3.x | 3.03 | Netscape | July 31, 1997 | |
| Netscape Navigator | 3.x | 3.04 | Netscape | October 4, 1997 | |
| Netscape Navigator/Communicator | 4.x | 4.0 | Netscape | June 11, 1997 | Suite version marketed as Netscape Communicator included Navigator, Messenger, Composer, Collabra, Netcaster, and Conference. |
| Netscape Navigator/Communicator | 4.x | 4.01 | Netscape | June 18, 1997 | |
| Netscape Navigator/Communicator | 4.x | 4.01a | Netscape | July 19, 1997 | |
| Netscape Navigator/Communicator | 4.x | 4.02 | Netscape | August 18, 1997 | |
| Netscape Navigator/Communicator | 4.x | 4.03 | Netscape | September 14, 1997 | |
| Netscape Navigator/Communicator | 4.x | 4.04 | Netscape | November 14, 1997 | |
| Netscape Navigator/Communicator | 4.x | 4.05 | Netscape | April 2, 1998 | |
| Netscape Navigator/Communicator | 4.x | 4.06 | Netscape | August 17, 1998 | Added Macromedia Flash plug-in, "Smart Browsing", and NetWatch. |
| Netscape Navigator/Communicator | 4.x | 4.07 | Netscape | October 5, 1998 | |
| Netscape Navigator/Communicator | 4.x | 4.08 | Netscape | November 9, 1998 | Last release for 16-bit Windows and 68k Macs |
| Netscape Communicator | 4.x | 4.5 | Netscape | October 19, 1998 | Added integrated/Internet messaging, enhanced SmartBrowsing |
| Netscape Communicator | 4.x | 4.51 | Netscape | March 8, 1999 | |
| Netscape Communicator | 4.x | 4.6 | Netscape | May 18, 1999 | Added AIM, RealPlayer G2, NetHelp |
| Netscape Communicator | 4.x | 4.61 | Netscape | June 14, 1999 | |
| Netscape Communicator | 4.x | 4.7 | Netscape | September 30, 1999 | Added Netscape Radio, Shop@Netscape, AIM 3.0, Winamp and PalmPilot. |
| Netscape Communicator | 4.x | 4.72 | Netscape | February 22, 2000 | Removed Calendar Client feature |
| Netscape Communicator | 4.x | 4.73 | Netscape | May 5, 2000 | |
| Netscape Communicator | 4.x | 4.74 | Netscape | July 22, 2000 | |
| Netscape Communicator | 4.x | 4.75 | Netscape | September 17, 2000 | |
| Netscape Communicator | 4.x | 4.76 | Netscape | October 25, 2000 | |
| Netscape Communicator | 4.x | 4.77 | Netscape | April 16, 2001 | |
| Netscape Communicator | 4.x | 4.78 | Netscape | July 20, 2001 | |
| Netscape Communicator | 4.x | 4.79 | Netscape | November 10, 2001 | |
| Netscape Communicator | 4.x | 4.8 | Netscape | August 22, 2002 | Final Communicator-based release |
| Netscape 5 | 5.x | PreAlpha1 | Netscape | | Never released, didn't reach Alpha or Beta status |
| Netscape 5 | 5.x | PreAlpha2 | NSLayout | | |
| Netscape 6 | 6.x | 6.0 | Mozilla 0.6 | November 14, 2000 | First Netscape release based on pre-release Mozilla Application Suite. Included Sidebar, customisable installer size, integrated search, themes, privacy protection, and multiple e-mail accounts. |
| Netscape 6 | 6.x | 6.01 | Mozilla 0.7 | February 9, 2001 | |
| Netscape 6 | 6.x | 6.1 | Mozilla 0.9.2.1 | August 8, 2001 | Added new default interface, searching from location bar, Mac OS X support on preview release. |
| Netscape 6 | 6.x | 6.2 | Mozilla 0.9.4.1 | October 30, 2001 | Improved QuickLaunch, AutoComplete. Full support for Mac OS X and Windows XP |
| Netscape 6 | 6.x | 6.2.1 | Mozilla 0.9.4.1 | | |
| Netscape 6 | 6.x | 6.2.2 | Mozilla 0.9.4.1 | | |
| Netscape 6 | 6.x | 6.2.3 | Mozilla 0.9.4.1 | May 15, 2002 | Last officially supported version on Windows 95. |
| Netscape 7 | 7.x | 7.0 | Mozilla 1.0.1 | August 29, 2002 | Based on final Mozilla Suite releases. Added tabbed browsing, pop-up blocker, full-screen mode, download manager, and P3P support. |
| Netscape 7 | 7.x | 7.01 | Mozilla 1.0.2 | December 10, 2002 | |
| Netscape 7 | 7.x | 7.02 | Mozilla 1.0.2 | February 18, 2003 | Last release to support Mac OS 9. |
| Netscape 7 | 7.x | 7.1 | Mozilla 1.4 | June 30, 2003 | Support Windows Media Player ActiveX control, web services by JavaScript APIs. |
| Netscape 7 | 7.x | 7.2 | Mozilla 1.7.2 | August 17, 2004 | Improved password manager, vCard support, Palm Sync. Added Netscape Toolbar and table editing in Composer. |
| Netscape Browser | 8.x | 0.5.6 | Firefox 0.9.3 | November 30, 2004 | Stand-alone Windows-only browser based on Firefox, beta version. Uses both Gecko and Trident layout engines. Added site controls, multibar, password auto-fill, and advanced tabbed browsing controls. |
| Netscape Browser | 8.x | 0.6.4 | Firefox 1.0 | January 7, 2005 | Pre-beta version |
| Netscape Browser | 8.x | 0.9.4 | Firefox 1.0 | February 17, 2005 | Pre-beta version |
| Netscape Browser | 8.x | 0.9.5 | Firefox 1.0 | February 23, 2005 | Pre-beta version |
| Netscape Browser | 8.x | 0.9.6 | Firefox 1.0 | March 3, 2005 | Beta version |
| Netscape Browser | 8.x | 8.0 | Firefox 1.0.3 | May 19, 2005 | Finished Netscape 8 release |
| Netscape Browser | 8.x | 8.0.1 | Firefox 1.0.3 | May 19, 2005 | |
| Netscape Browser | 8.x | 8.0.2 | Firefox 1.0.4 | June 17, 2005 | |
| Netscape Browser | 8.x | 8.0.3.1 | Firefox 1.0.6 | July 25, 2005 | |
| Netscape Browser | 8.x | 8.0.3.3 | Firefox 1.0.6 | August 8, 2005 | |
| Netscape Browser | 8.x | 8.0.3.4 | Firefox 1.0.6 | August 17, 2005 | |
| Netscape Browser | 8.x | 8.0.4 | Firefox 1.0.7 | October 19, 2005 | |
| Netscape Browser | 8.x | 8.1 | Firefox 1.0.7 | January 25, 2006 | Added spyware and adware protection, new Dynamic Security Centre, profile manager, new options panel, and enhanced RSS controls. |
| Netscape Browser | 8.x | 8.1.2 | Firefox 1.5.0.7 | September 27, 2006 | |
| Netscape Browser | 8.x | 8.1.3 | Firefox 1.5.0.11 | April 2, 2007 | Final Netscape 8 release |
| Netscape Navigator | 9.x | 9.0b1 | Firefox 2.0.0.4 | June 15, 2007 | Stand-alone browser based on Mozilla Firefox 2, total rewrite from Netscape 8.x. Gecko-only support. Added Netscape.com integration, enhanced FTP listing interface, customizable link-pad, multi-platform support, greater Firefox add-on compatibility, and new user interface. |
| Netscape Navigator | 9.x | 9.0b2 | Firefox 2.0.0.4 | July 12, 2007 | Added greater tabbed browsing options |
| Netscape Navigator | 9.x | 9.0b3 | Firefox 2.0.0.6 | August 15, 2007 | Removed Propeller integration. |
| Netscape Navigator | 9.x | 9.0rc1 | Firefox 2.0.0.6 | October 1, 2007 | Re-added optional splash screen |
| Netscape Navigator | 9.x | 9.0 | Firefox 2.0.0.7 | October 15, 2007 | Finished Navigator 9 release |
| Netscape Navigator | 9.x | 9.0.0.1 | Firefox 2.0.0.8 | October 22, 2007 | |
| Netscape Navigator | 9.x | 9.0.0.2 | Firefox 2.0.0.8 | November 1, 2007 | |
| Netscape Navigator | 9.x | 9.0.0.3 | Firefox 2.0.0.9 | November 2, 2007 | |
| Netscape Navigator | 9.x | 9.0.0.4 | Firefox 2.0.0.10 | November 27, 2007 | |
| Netscape Navigator | 9.x | 9.0.0.5 | Firefox 2.0.0.11 | December 11, 2007 | |
| Netscape Navigator | 9.x | 9.0.0.6 | Firefox 2.0.0.12 | February 20, 2008 | Final version of Navigator 9. Support discontinued March 1, 2008. |

== See also ==
- Firefox
- Gecko
- Blink element
- SeaMonkey
