= Netscape Navigator 2 =

Discontinued proprietary web browser

- Developer: Netscape Communications Corporation
- Initial release: September 18, 1995 (2.0b1)
- Platform: Windows 3.1/95/NT; Classic Mac OS 68K; OS/2 Warp; Linux 1.2, IRIX, HP-UX, AIX, Solaris, SunOS, JavaOS, FreeBSD
- Type: Web browser

Netscape Navigator 2 is a discontinued proprietary web browser released by Netscape Communications Corporation as its flagship product. Versions were available for Microsoft Windows, Apple Macintosh, Linux, IRIX, HP-UX, AIX, Solaris, SunOS, JavaOS, and FreeBSD.

The browser introduced and improved several features and also added proprietary extensions to the HTML standard. Notably, Netscape 2 was the first browser to support JavaScript and animated GIFs, two technologies still predominant on the web today.

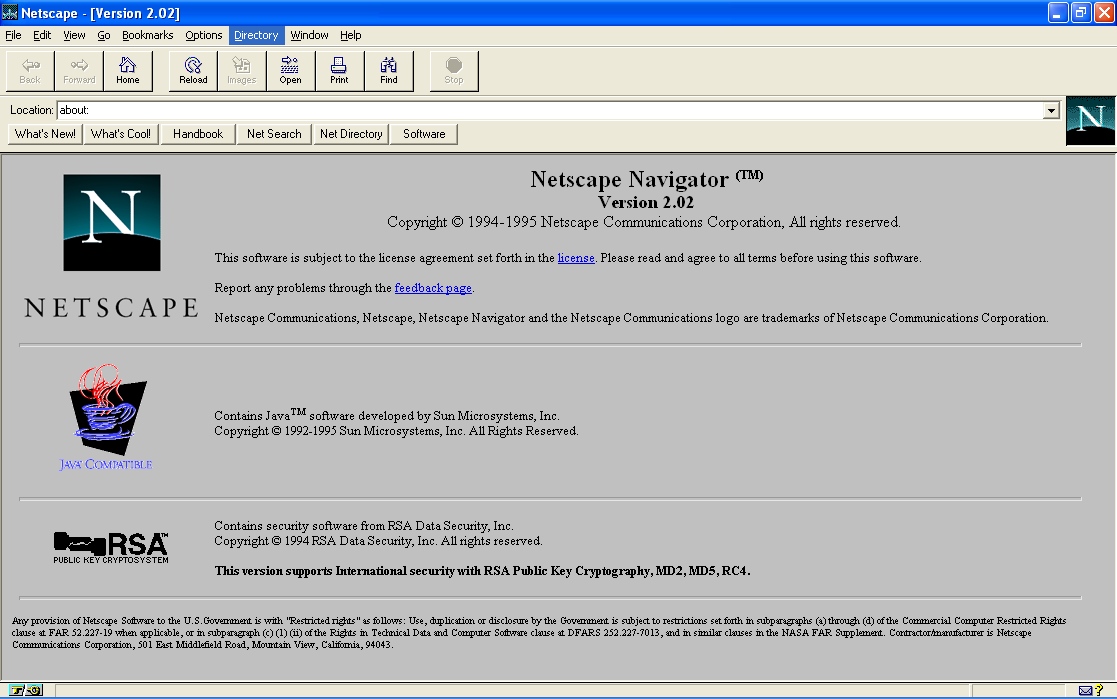
Screenshot

== Features ==
The browser introduced many new or improved features:

- Support for progressive JPEGs (previous versions supported only the baseline format)
- Support for GIF89a (previous versions supported only GIF87a)
- Support for client-side image maps (previous versions supported only server-side image maps)
- Support for plugins (previous versions supported only helper applications)
- Improved bookmark organization
- Added support for FTP uploading
- Added support for JavaScript (initially marketed as LiveScript in 2.0b1 and 2.0b2)
- Added OLE support
- Added support for HTML frames
- Introduced Netscape Mail and Netscape News, an e-mail client and Usenet News reader, respectively

== Netscape Now ==
Netscape Now! 2.0 web badge

To promote Netscape Navigator, Netscape developed the "Netscape Now" program. The program promoted the display of the "Netscape Now! 2.0" web badge on websites with newly supported features, including frames, live objects, Java applets, and JavaScript.

== Popular plugins ==
The support for plugins led to the development of several popular plugins to extend Navigator's functionality.

- Acrobat Amber - Released in early 1996 by Adobe Systems, it allowed for a pdf to be streamed.
- Lightning Strike - Released by Inifinet, it offered non-standard real-time wavelet compression
- RealAudio Player
- MovieStar - Released by Intelligence at Large, it offered streaming of QuickTime videos (as there wasn't a QuickTime plugin yet)
- Macromedia Shockwave Player
- Netcloak

== Easter eggs ==
Netscape had several easter eggs. Navigator 2 featured verse 12:10 from The Book of Mozilla.

The bottom of "about:authors" read:

All human actions are equivalent ... and ... all are on principle doomed ...

— Jean-Paul Sartre, Being and Nothingness, Conclusion, sct. 2
