= Propeller.com =

Social news aggregator by AOL-Netscape

Former Propeller logo, while hosted under Netscape

'Netscape's Propeller' was a social news aggregator operated by AOL-Netscape. It was similar to Digg; users could vote for which stories are to be included on the front page and could comment on them as well. As of October 1, 2010, Netscape's Propeller ceased to be active.

The Chief Architect of the site was Brian Alvey and the lead developer of the site was Alex Rudloff. It was maintained by Weblogs, Inc. CEO Jason Calacanis until he left AOL in November 2006. The last director was Tom Drapeau. Netscape's market share had been declining for over a year at the time of the change over.

Netscape's Propeller was hosted on the Netscape.com domain from June 2006 to September 2007 when it was replaced by the AOL Netscape generic portal.

The previous version of Netscape's Propeller was released to mixed reactions. Some users liked that they had more participation ability, while others found the pages to be harder to navigate and not as structured. Soon after the release of the new site, a story entitled "Netscape's Blunder" was the top rated story.

== Anchors ==
Netscape's Propeller had several "anchors", which were led by James Marcus, who work on maintaining the site and featuring stories in the "anchor picks" box on the home page. This creates a slightly different environment from Digg, as Digg's homepage rankings are based solely on user votes, where Propeller's are based on both. The rest of the team includes Alexia Prichard.

== Scouts ==
Netscape's Propeller also paid a small number of power users called Scouts. This group was run by Ryan Budke and made up of Weblogs, Inc. bloggers, Propeller power users and celebrities, including Wil Wheaton. Other scouts included bloggers such as Jeff Hoard, Angry Ken, Karina Longworth, Steve Head, Greg DeMaderios, Henry Wang, Digidave, TweekerChick and Corey Spring. These users were called Navigators until the relaunch of the Netscape Navigator browser, at which point the name was changed to avoid confusion.

== See also ==
- Mixx
