= Netscape 6 =

Discontinued Internet suite

- Developers: Netscape Communications Corporation; AOL
- Initial release: November 14, 2000; 25 years ago
- Final release: 6.2.3 / 15 May 2002
- Operating system: Cross-platform
- Predecessor: Netscape Communicator
- Successor: Netscape 7
- Type: Internet suite
- License: Proprietary EULA

Netscape 6 is a discontinued Internet suite developed by Netscape Communications Corporation, and was the sixth major release of the Netscape series of browsers. It superseded Netscape Communicator (4.x), as the release of Netscape Communicator 5 was scrapped. Netscape 6 was the first browser of the Netscape line to be based on another source code: Mozilla Application Suite, an open-source software package from the Mozilla Foundation, which was created by Netscape in 1998.

Netscape 6 was first released on November 14, 2000. Version 6.2.3 was the last release in 2002, and it was succeeded by Netscape 7.

It consisted of the following major components:

- a web browser
- an e-mail and news client, Netscape Mail & Newsgroups
- an address book
- an HTML editor, Netscape Composer
- an instant messaging client, AOL Instant Messenger

== History and development ==
In March 1998, Netscape split off most of the Communicator code and put it under an open source license. The project was dubbed Mozilla. It was estimated that turning the gutted source code (all proprietary elements had to be removed) into a new browser release might take a year, and so it was decided that the next release of the corporate Netscape browser, version 5.0, would be based on it. Netscape assigned its browser development engineers to help with the project.

Later that year it was quite evident that development on Mozilla was not proceeding quickly, so Netscape reassigned some of its engineers to a new Communicator 4.5 release. This had the result of redirecting part of the browser effort into a dead-end branch while Internet Explorer 5.0 was still building momentum.

The version 5 of the browser was skipped, at the time when Internet Explorer 5.0 had been available for a year and a half. There were plans to release an almost-ready version 5.0 based on the 4.x codebase, but this idea was scrapped. The Mozilla engineers decided in late October 1998 to scrap the Communicator code and start over from scratch using the standards-compliant Gecko rendering engine. All resources were bound to work on the Netscape 6.0 release using Gecko, which some Netscape employees deem one of the bigger mistakes in the company's history.

The first public builds of Mozilla two years later (2000) were rather disappointing, with many mid-level PCs of the time too slow to run the larger codebase, which used its own custom set of graphical user interface widgets and had a customizable UI built in a custom XML dialect known as XUL. With public beta versions released in April, August, and October, Netscape 6.0 shipped in November 2000. At release, the browser was deemed too unstable for production use.

Versions 6.1 and 6.2, released in 2001, addressed stability problems, and were more respected, but still had a relatively small number of users, and Netscape 6 was facing new competition from Internet Explorer 6.0, released in the summer of 2001.

== Release history ==
- Netscape 6.0 – November 14, 2000 (based on Mozilla 0.6)
- Netscape 6.01 – February 7, 2001 (based on Mozilla 0.6)
- Netscape 6.1 – August 8, 2001 (based on Mozilla 0.9.2.1)
- Netscape 6.2 – October 30, 2001 (based on Mozilla 0.9.4.1)
- Netscape 6.2.1 – November 29, 2001 (based on Mozilla 0.9.4.1)
- Netscape 6.2.2 – March 19, 2002 (based on Mozilla 0.9.4.1)
- Netscape 6.2.3 – May 15, 2002 (based on Mozilla 0.9.4.1)

== See also ==
- Netscape
- Mozilla Application Suite

Preceded by Netscape 5 (development suspended)	Netscape 6	Succeeded by Netscape 7
