= Netscape Communicator =

Discontinued Internet software suite

- Developer: Netscape Communications Corporation
- Initial release: June 1997; 28 years ago
- Final release: 4.8 / 22 August 2002
- Platform: Cross-platform
- Successor: Netscape 6
- Type: Internet suite
- Website: archive.netscape.com at the Wayback Machine (archived June 21, 2011)

Netscape Communicator (or Netscape 4) is a discontinued Internet suite produced by Netscape Communications Corporation, and was the fourth major release in the Netscape line of browsers. It was first in beta in 1996 and was released in June 1997. Netscape Communicator addressed the problem of Netscape Navigator 3.x being used as both the name of the suite and the browser contained within it by renaming the suite to Netscape Communicator. It included more groupware features intended to appeal to enterprises.

In February 1998, Netscape announced that Mozilla.org would coordinate the development of Netscape Communicator 5 as "a dedicated team within Netscape with an associated Web site that will promote, foster, and guide open dialog and development of Netscape's client source code." However, the aging Communicator code proved to be difficult to work with, so it was abandoned. The whole source code of Communicator was rewritten by Mozilla, which was then testing it as Mozilla Application Suite. Netscape, now owned by AOL, finally released Communicator's successor Netscape 6 in November 2000, based on Mozilla Application Suite with changes and additions. Minor updates to Communicator continued to be issued, culminating in the release of Netscape Communicator 4.8 in August 2002.

== Editions ==
Netscape Communicator was available in various editions, such as "Professional" and "Complete". The following components were included in Netscape Communicator (different editions had different components, and some components were dropped in later editions):

=== Features ===
- Netscape Navigator – web browser
- Netscape Messenger – e-mail client and (in version 4.5 and above) news client
- Netscape Collabra – news client (merged into Messenger in version 4.5)
- Netscape Address Book – address book
- Netscape Composer – HTML editor
- Netscape Netcaster – push technology client (dropped in version 4.5)
- Netscape Conference – multi-user communication client (dropped in version 4.5)
- Netscape Calendar – enterprise calendar client (dropped in version 4.72 because Netscape's license to use the underlying technology expired)

=== Updates ===
In October 1998, a major update to the program was released as Netscape 4.5. This included many improvements, mostly to the Messenger e-mail client, which now also took on the features of Collabra. However, some of the less popular components, such as Netcaster, were dropped. A feature called "Roaming Profiles" was added in version 4.5 that synchronized a user's bookmarks, address book, and preferences with a remote server, so that a user's home and work browsers could have the same bookmarks. By the time version 4.5 was released, Netscape had started the Mozilla open source project and had ceased charging for Communicator.

The term "Navigator" referred to the browser component alone, while "Communicator" referred to the suite as a whole, as established in version 4.0. However, due to user confusion, the names were often used interchangeably. Also, because none of the applications besides Navigator were popular on their own, and because Netscape never produced any other desktop software that approached the popularity of Navigator, people would often refer to both the Communicator suite and the Navigator browser as simply "Netscape".

The Mozilla Foundation continued to develop the Netscape code base, providing the Mozilla Application Suite as a continuation of Netscape Communicator. The Mozilla Foundation decided in 2006 to discontinue development of the Application Suite. A community-maintained version called SeaMonkey has come to replace the Application Suite - maintaining such things as a browser, an integrated POP/IMAP/SMTP style E-mail client, IRC, and other similar features.

== See also ==
- List of web browsers
- List of Usenet newsreaders
- List of HTML editors
- Comparison of web browsers
- Comparison of Usenet newsreaders
- Comparison of e-mail clients
- Comparison of HTML editors
- SeaMonkey application suite

Preceded by Netscape Navigator (1-4.08)	Netscape Communicator (4)	Succeeded by Netscape 5 (developing suspended)
