= Netscape Navigator 9 =

Last version of the classic web browser, essentially rebranded Firefox

Netscape Navigator 9.0
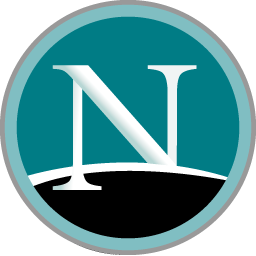

- Netscape Navigator 9.0.0.6 on Windows Vista displaying the main page of the English Wikipedia
- Developers: Netscape Communications; AOL
- Release: October 15, 2007
- Final release: 9.0.0.6 / 20 February 2008
- Preview release: 9.0rc1 / 1 October 2007
- Written in: C++
- Operating system: Linux, macOS, Windows
- Type: Web browser
- License: Proprietary

Netscape Navigator 9 is a discontinued web browser that was produced by the Netscape Communications division of parent AOL, first announced on January 23, 2007. It was the ninth major release of the Netscape line of browsers. After AOL outsourced the development of Netscape Browser 8 to Mercurial Communications in 2004, Netscape Navigator 9 marked the first Netscape browser to be produced in-house since the Netscape 7 suite. It also saw the return of the classic Navigator name, which was previously used during Netscape's heyday between versions 1.0 and 4.08 in the 1990s. Netscape Navigator 9 is based on Mozilla Firefox 2.0.

The program's first beta was released on June 5, 2007, with the Beta 2 on July 12, and Beta 3 on August 16. After a release candidate, the final release was issued on October 15, 2007.

On December 28, 2007, Netscape developers announced that AOL would discontinue their web browser on February 1, 2008. On January 28, 2008, Netscape revised this date to March 1, 2008, and offered support for migration to Flock and Mozilla Firefox. It was the last web browser of the Netscape series.

== Features ==
=== New features ===
The Beta releases of Netscape Navigator 9 included enhanced newsfeed support and were more integrated with the Netscape.com Internet portal, including enhanced methods of discussion, submission and voting of Web pages. However, starting with Netscape Navigator 9 beta 3, the Netscape.com integration was optional, and certain aspects of integration could be manually enabled or disabled, with integration being totally removed in Navigator 9.0rc1 as the portal relaunched as Propeller.

The user interface of the program was also updated, and the theme was also later released for use on Mozilla Firefox.

Like Netscape version 8.x, Navigator 9 was based upon the Mozilla Firefox, this time version 2.0, and should have had full support of all Firefox add-ons and plugins, some of which Netscape was providing. Netscape also released some of its features as extensions for Firefox, including the Site Mail Notifier and Friends' Activity Sidebar, the Digg Tracker, as well as Netstripe, the new default theme for Netscape 9.

The browser also included URL self-correction, which corrected common URL misspellings, an improved FTP listing interface and a dedicated News menu with integration to the Netscape.com news portal. A quick "link pad" was also included so Web pages could quickly be added to the pad for later viewing without adding to the bookmark lists. Navigator 9 also sees the browser return to multi-platform support across Windows, Linux and Mac OS X. Netscape's signature splash screen also reappeared in the release candidate of the final program.

=== Removed features ===
Unlike Netscape 8, the browser did not use Internet Explorer's Trident layout engine as an alternative engine option. Netscape Navigator did not include any newsgroup, instant messaging, or Email clients as Netscape 6 and 7 did. Netscape did, however, plan to produce a companion email client to complement the Navigator, confirmed as Netscape Messenger 9. While that software was in development, Netscape advised its users to use the Netscape 7 series of suites, which includes an email client, alongside Navigator 9 for browsing purposes.

=== Decorative features ===
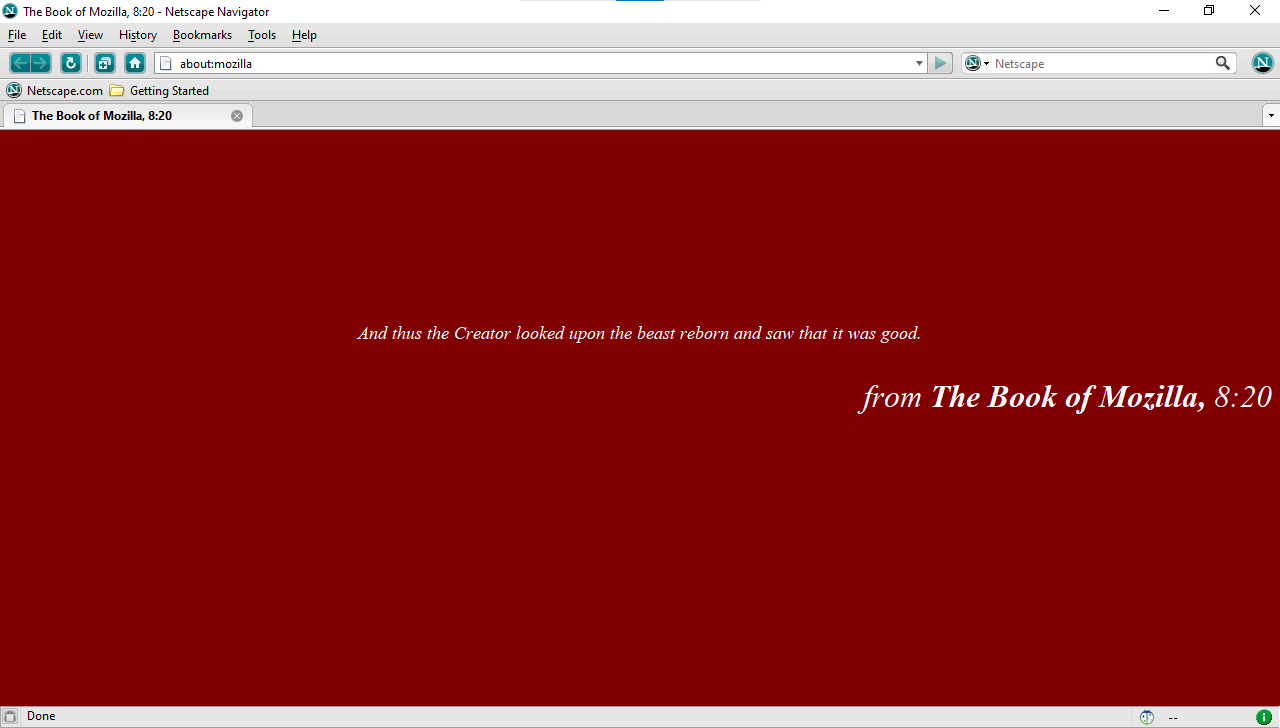
Screenshot of The Book of Mozilla, 8:20 in Netscape 9

A new verse 8:20 of the Easter egg The Book of Mozilla was written for the release of Netscape 9, consisting of "And thus the Creator looked upon the beast reborn and saw that it was good". This could have reference either to the re-development of Netscape in-house once again, or the Mozilla Foundation and its contributors.

Based on user feedback, Netscape decided to return the splash screen to Navigator 9. On September 10, 2007, Netscape decided to give its design team a break and let users submit their own idea for how the splash screen should look. The winning image would be used as the splash screen in the final 9.0 release of Navigator, and the designer would be listed in the browser credits.

Many designs were submitted. In the end, Mario Herbert was chosen the winner and his design used as the final Navigator 9 splash screen.

== Response ==
CNET Download.com claimed Navigator 9 had some "neat" components, contained many "tricks we love," and was "more than a backup browser," which it previously used to describe Browser 8. Most of the bundled features from version 8 have been removed.

== System requirements ==
System requirements
Requirement	Minimum	Recommended
Windows
Operating system	Windows 98	Windows XP
CPU	233 MHz	500 MHz
Memory	64 MB	256 MB
Free space	50 MB	100 MB
Mac OS
Operating system	Mac OS X 10.2.8 through Mac OS X 10.6.2	
CPU	PowerPC G3	PowerPC G4 or Intel equivalent
Memory	128 MB	512 MB
Free space	75 MB	150 MB
Linux
Operating system	Linux kernel 2.2.14 (with glibc 2.3.2, XFree86 3.3.6, GTK+ 2.0, fontconfig/xft and libstdc++ 5)	
CPU	233 MHz	500 MHz
Memory	64 MB	256 MB
Free space	50 MB	100 MB

== Release history ==
Release history
Version	Release date	Based on the Mozilla Firefox version
9.0b1	June 5, 2007	2.0.0.4
9.0b2	July 12, 2007	2.0.0.4
9.0b3	August 16, 2007	2.0.0.6
9.0rc1	October 1, 2007	2.0.0.7
9.0	October 15, 2007	2.0.0.7
9.0.0.1	October 22, 2007	2.0.0.8
9.0.0.2	November 1, 2007	2.0.0.8
9.0.0.3	November 2, 2007	2.0.0.9
9.0.0.4	November 27, 2007	2.0.0.10
9.0.0.5	December 10, 2007	2.0.0.11
9.0.0.6	February 20, 2008	2.0.0.12

== See also ==
- List of feed aggregators
- Comparison of feed aggregators

Preceded by Netscape Browser (8)	Netscape Navigator 9 (final)	Succeeded by development ceased replaced by Mozilla Firefox
