= Netscape Browser =

Web browser

- Developers: Mercurial Communications for AOL, Netscape
- Initial release: 8.0 (2005)
- Stable release: 8.1.3 / 2 April 2007
- Preview release: 0.9.6 / 3 March 2005
- Operating system: Microsoft Windows (XP, 2000, Me, 98)
- Predecessor: Netscape 7
- Successor: Netscape Navigator 9
- Type: Web browser
- License: Proprietary

Netscape Browser (or Netscape 8) is the eighth major release of the Netscape series of web browsers, now all discontinued. It was published by AOL, but developed by Mercurial Communications, and originally released for Windows on May 19, 2005.

Netscape Browser was the first browser of the Netscape series to be based on Mozilla Firefox, as opposed to Netscape versions 6 and 7, which were based on Mozilla Application Suite. Also, Netscape 6 and 7 were Internet suites whereas Netscape Browser (version 8) was solely a web browser.

As with other recent versions, it incorporates support for AOL Instant Messenger and other AOL-related features.

Netscape Browser was succeeded by Netscape Navigator 9, which reverted to the Navigator name.

Netscape Browser 0.5.6+, the first alpha release of Netscape Browser

== Release history and milestones ==
Netscape Browser version	Release date	Based on the Mozilla Firefox version
0.5.6+	November 30, 2004	0.9.3
0.6.4	January 7, 2005	1.0
0.9.4 (8.0 pre-beta)	February 17, 2005	1.0
0.9.5 (8.0 pre-beta)	February 23, 2005	1.0
0.9.6 (8.0 beta)	March 3, 2005	1.0
8.0	May 19, 2005	1.0.3
8.0.1	May 19, 2005	1.0.4
8.0.2	June 17, 2005	1.0.4
8.0.3.1	July 25, 2005	1.0.6
8.0.3.3	August 8, 2005	1.0.6
8.0.3.4	August 17, 2005	1.0.6
8.0.4	October 19, 2005	1.0.7
8.1	January 25, 2006	1.0.7
8.1.2	September 27, 2006	1.0.8
8.1.3	April 2, 2007	1.0.8

The browser was released on May 19, 2005. A minor update known as version 8.0.1 was released a few hours later to incorporate the key security patches added in Firefox 1.0.4.

== Features ==
The Fusion theme included with version 8.0-8.0.4

The revised Fusion theme, included in versions 8.1-8.1.3

A noteworthy feature introduced in Netscape Browser is the ability to use either of two layout engines to render websites — either Internet Explorer 6's Trident layout engine or the Gecko engine used by Mozilla and its derivatives. This is used as part of the browser's "Site Controls" system, which allows security settings to be altered on a per-site basis, and is also touted as a defense against phishing and similar attacks, with both blacklists and whitelists built in and automatically updated regularly. This system decides whether a site is "trusted" or "suspect", while only whitelisted sites use the Trident engine by default.

However, this feature is actually implemented by using the IE ActiveX control, which is composed of most of IE's architecture.

Other features highlighted by AOL's publicity include improved tabbed browsing abilities, a toolbar system called the "MultiBar," which includes up to 10 toolbars in the space of one, and extra support for "Live Content", such as RSS feeds. In keeping with the security emphasis, a new secure form of information and password management system, known as a "PassCard," which saves usernames and passwords for individual sites, is also included.

In Netscape version 8.1, the Security Center feature is much more integrated into the browser, and extra features, such as ID Theft Protection and Spyware Protection, have been integrated.

Netscape includes a host of "widgets" designed to improve the browsing experience, including Local Weather information, Movie Times and reviews, Mapquest maps, Yellow pages, White pages, Stocks, and a City guide, all integrated into menu-enabled toolbar buttons.

Furthermore, a webmail button is included in the toolbar, which links directly to multiple webmail homepages and is configurable for multiple webmail accounts. A button to run the user's default mail client is included.

There are multiple smaller features included, including a shortcut menu that appears when text is selected to paste the selected text directly into a search engine of choice.

Finally, the browser includes a pop-up advertisement blocker which can be configured to allow pop-ups for individual sites, block only unrequested pop-ups, and open any pop-ups in new tabs in one window, thus preventing pop-unders.

== Criticism ==
The Netscape Browser has been criticized for various reasons. Perhaps the most severe is the claim that, in contradiction to its claimed emphasis on security, its use of both the Trident and Gecko rendering engines means it unavoidably inherits all the vulnerabilities of both engines, making it potentially less secure than either Firefox or IE on their own.

=== Renderer modality problems ===
The switching between rendering engines may also confuse users, since the web browsing experience is very different depending on which is used. A standards-based website will generally render better in Gecko thanks to its better standards support, but Netscape Browser renders whitelisted pages using Trident instead. "As the switching is transparent to the user, users are left wondering why their experience changes randomly across different websites".

=== User interface issues ===
The optional theme "Fusion" has also been criticized because it does not conform to the Microsoft human interface guidelines (HIG), either "Luna" or "classic" style, although the default theme, "Winscape", looks more like a traditional Windows application. There is also a claim that the usability of the browser is reduced by not obeying standard Windows manipulations. Similarly, the excessive nesting of tabs has been cited as a sign of generally poor interface design. The installation program of Netscape 8.12 prompts the user to select which theme would be preferred, with the traditional "Winscape" being checked by default.

=== Helper programs removed ===
Some users have argued that the formerly included email client and HTML editor were more valuable as part of the browser package than new features such as a live weather report and news ticker, especially since these applications were traditional in earlier versions. Firefox, upon which Netscape Browser is based, does not include an email client or HTML editor either, but a HTML editor extension can be downloaded from the Extensions and Themes section of the Firefox website , and email support is provided by Mozilla Thunderbird. Older Netscape releases were based upon the Mozilla Suite, which did include this functionality.

=== Collection of personal information ===
Another criticism is that the browser collects user browsing behavior by default . By default, the option "Allow Netscape to gather anonymous browser usage statistics" is enabled. The option is found in the "Advanced Settings" during installation. As many casual users may skip the dialogs during installation, this feature could be turned on in many installations of the Netscape Browser. Some argue this feature should be called spyware; however, this term usually applies only to software that attempts to send private information to companies, often later selling this to advertisers, whereas the information collected is actually anonymous.

=== Password issues ===
A related possible criticism is that in the browser's password manager menu, saved passwords can be viewed in plain text. Thus, if a user has access to another's account, they could retrieve all their usernames and passwords in plain text with little effort. Further, this option cannot be turned off or removed without editing the software. This problem doesn't happen in version 8.1.3.

=== XML rendering issue (fixed) ===
A few days after Netscape 8.0.1 was released, Microsoft reported that the browser disables the XML rendering engine in Internet Explorer by causing IE to render XML pages as a blank page. Netscape fixed the issue in version 8.0.2.

== Footnotes ==
1. NS8, part 1: I need closure. Blake Ross' blog.
2. NS8, part 2: More horsepower than ever before. Blake Ross' blog.
3. Netscape Browser 8.0 Released. MozillaZine.
4. Netscape 8 and Internet Explorer's XML Rendering. IEBlog.
5. Netscape Gecko and Trident Rendering Engine Security Issues. Chris Ilias' Blog.

== See also ==
- Netscape
- Mozilla Firefox
- List of web browsers
- Comparison of web browsers

Preceded by Netscape 7	Netscape Browser (8)	Succeeded by Netscape Navigator 9 (final)
