= Brandable software =

Brandable software is typically software created by one company for the purpose of allowing other companies to obtain resell rights or giveaway rights to the software, change the brand associated with it, and sell it as if it were their own. It may also be referred to as private label software or Rebranded Software.

Brandable software is usually presented as an alternative to more expensive software development. In most cases, the company providing the software allows many features of the software to be changed by the customer, such as the software name, graphics, installer and website links.

There are various uses of brandable software. In many cases, it is placed on the customer's website in order to generate web traffic and increase name recognition. It can also be used as a source of additional revenue for the customer, or as the sole source of revenue for a new business.

== Customizable components ==
Brandable Software is normally designed so that certain components are customizable with the purchasing company's information. Among the most common are:

- Program name - The program is usually given a unique name chosen by the purchasing company
- Company name - The program is usually designed so that it appears to have been written by the purchasing company
- Name of the author - name of the person who made the program
- Product link(s) - Links to one or more sites with product or services offers
- Website - They purchasing company's website is usually displayed in numerous places within the software to promote brand name awareness and provide easy access to their website and other products
- Payment URL - The program's demo version will normally give the end user the option of opening a web browser directly to a page on the purchasing company's website that will allow them to immediately purchase the full version.
- Splash screen - The splash screen is displayed when the program is opened. There may be separate splash screens for the program's installer and the program itself. Graphic design for the splash screen and other graphical elements of the brandable software is usually provided and included in the purchase price, but can also be created by the purchasing company
- Logo - They purchasing company's logo, or a related image, is usually displayed within the software
- About box - This window usually displays information about the program, version number, and company
- End User License Agreement - The End User License Agreement (EULA) can normally be customized
- Readme - Normally a short introduction to the software with contact information or additional instructions.
- Help file - The help file is usually created so that no reference is made to the program name or company name. This allows it to be used repeatedly for differently branded versions of the software. It is usually possible for the purchasing company to edit the help file.
- Start Menu - In most cases, a start menu folder with the purchasing company's name is created on the end user's machine ([Company Name] Software). Then sub-folders are created for each of that company's branded programs. This helps to keep all of purchasing company's software folders organized in one central folder.
- Installer - The installer is usually also branded with the purchasing company's identifying information, graphics and logos.
- Demo version and full version - In most cases the branded software is delivered with both Demo and Full versions, so that the demo may be distributed free of charge but in limited capacity, and the Full version is only distributed once it has been purchased.
- Demo version type - A wide variety of demo types are usually available to choose from. These include demos that will run for a certain number of days, uses, time, or a combination of these things. Demo versions may also have a smaller number of features available.

== Delivery ==
Once the software has been fully branded with the purchasing company's information it is normally bundled into an installer. Some common types are Windows Installer and executable formats. These can be distributed immediately to end-users without any prerequisite software.

== Resell rights ==
The purchasing company is given the right to resell their branded version of the software, normally at the price of their choosing. Depending on the agreement, the purchasing company may also be allowed to give their branded version of the software away for free or allow other companies to sell it. In most cases the purchasing company is only given the rights to the compiled version of the software, not the software's source code.

== Giveaway Rights ==
The person or the company has the right to give their branded version of the software away. But does not have the right to resell the software.
