= SeaMonkey =

Internet suite

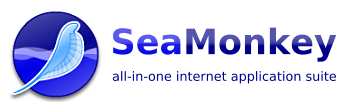

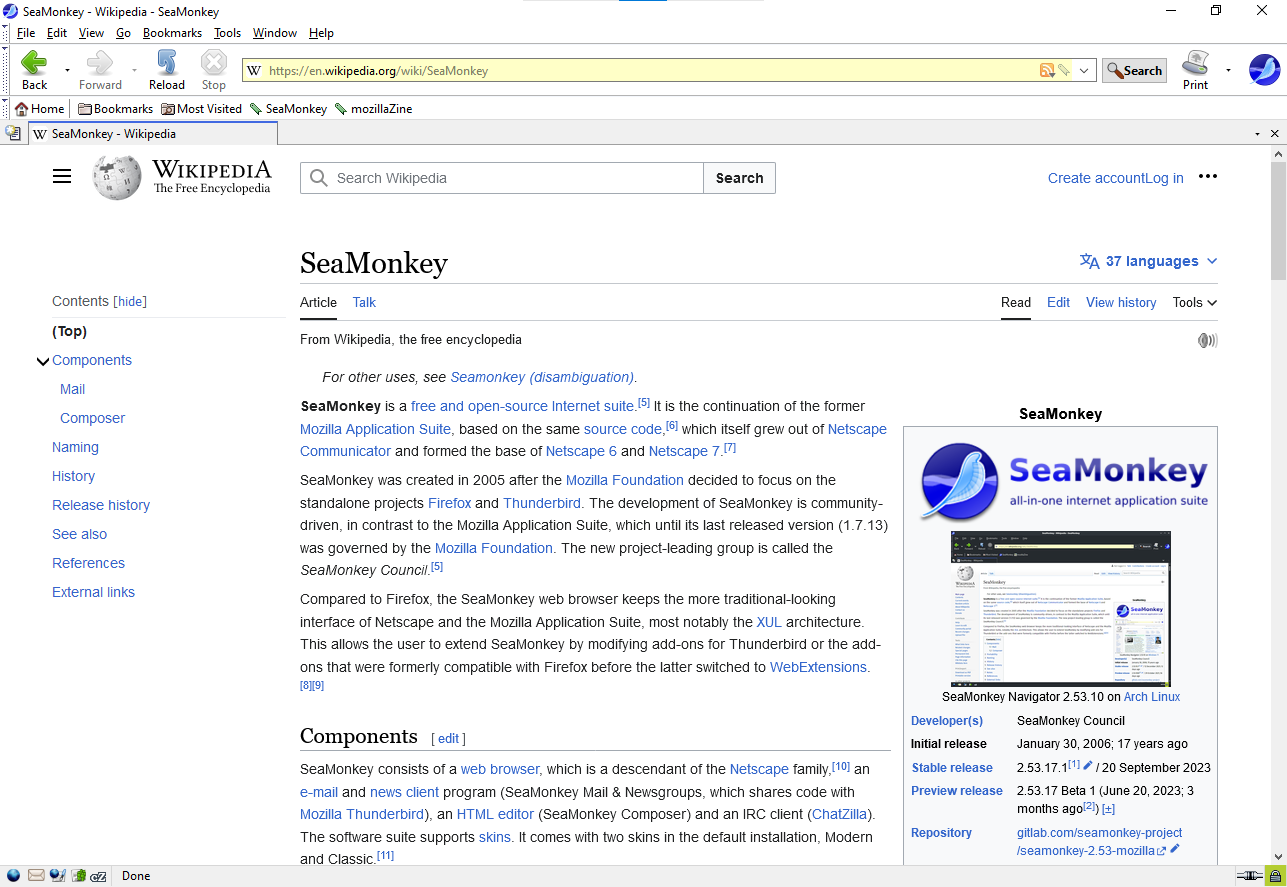
- SeaMonkey Navigator 2.53.17.1 on Windows 10
- Developer: SeaMonkey Council
- Release: January 30, 2006; 20 years ago
- Stable release: 2.53.24 / 28 July 2026
- Preview release: 2.53.22 Beta 1 (31 October 2025; 10 months ago) [±]
- Written in: C++, XUL, XBL, JavaScript
- Engines: Gecko, SpiderMonkey
- Operating system: Windows, macOS, Linux
- Available in: 26 languages
- List of languages Belarusian, Catalan, Chinese (Simplified), Chinese (Traditional), Czech, Dutch, English (US), English (British), Finnish, French, Galician, German, Hungarian, Italian, Japanese, Lithuanian, Norwegian (Bokmål), Polish, Portuguese (Portugal), Russian, Slovak, Spanish (Argentina), Spanish (Spain), Swedish, Turkish, Ukrainian
- Type: Internet suite
- License: MPL-2.0
- Website: seamonkey-project.org
- Repository: gitlab.com/seamonkey-project/seamonkey-2.53-mozilla

SeaMonkey is a free and open-source Internet suite. It is the continuation of the former Mozilla Application Suite, based on the same source code, which itself grew out of Netscape Communicator and formed the base of Netscape 6 and Netscape 7.

SeaMonkey was created in 2005 after the Mozilla Foundation decided to focus on the standalone projects Firefox and Thunderbird. The development of SeaMonkey is community-driven, in contrast to the Mozilla Application Suite, which until its final version (1.7.13) was governed by the Mozilla Foundation. The new project-leading group is called the SeaMonkey Council.

Compared to Firefox, the SeaMonkey web browser keeps the more traditional-looking interface of Netscape and the Mozilla Application Suite. It also retains the legacy XPCOM-based add-on system which allows the user to extend SeaMonkey by modifying add-ons for Thunderbird or the add-ons that were formerly compatible with Firefox before the latter switched to WebExtensions.

== Components ==
SeaMonkey consists of a web browser (which is a descendant of the Netscape family), an email and news client program (SeaMonkey Mail & Newsgroups, which shares code with Mozilla Thunderbird), an HTML editor (SeaMonkey Composer) an IRC client (ChatZilla), and an RSS feed reader. The software suite supports skins. It comes with two skins in the default installation, Modern and Classic.

=== Mail ===
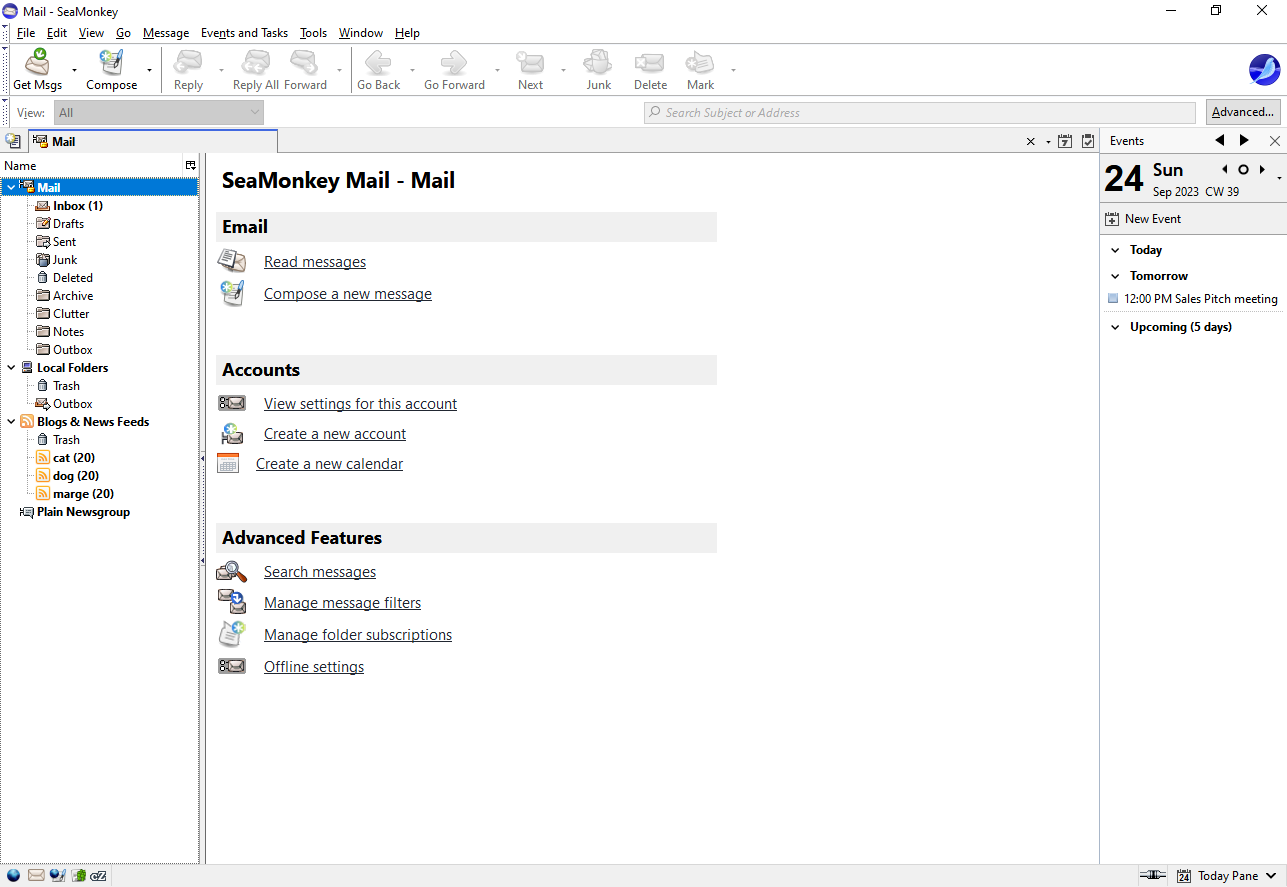
SeaMonkey Mail & Newsgroups 2.53.17.1

SeaMonkey Mail is a traditional e-mail client that includes support for multiple accounts, junk mail detection, message filters, HTML message support, and address books, among other features such as a calendar. It shares code with Mozilla Thunderbird; both Thunderbird and SeaMonkey are built from Mozilla's comm-central source tree.

=== Composer ===
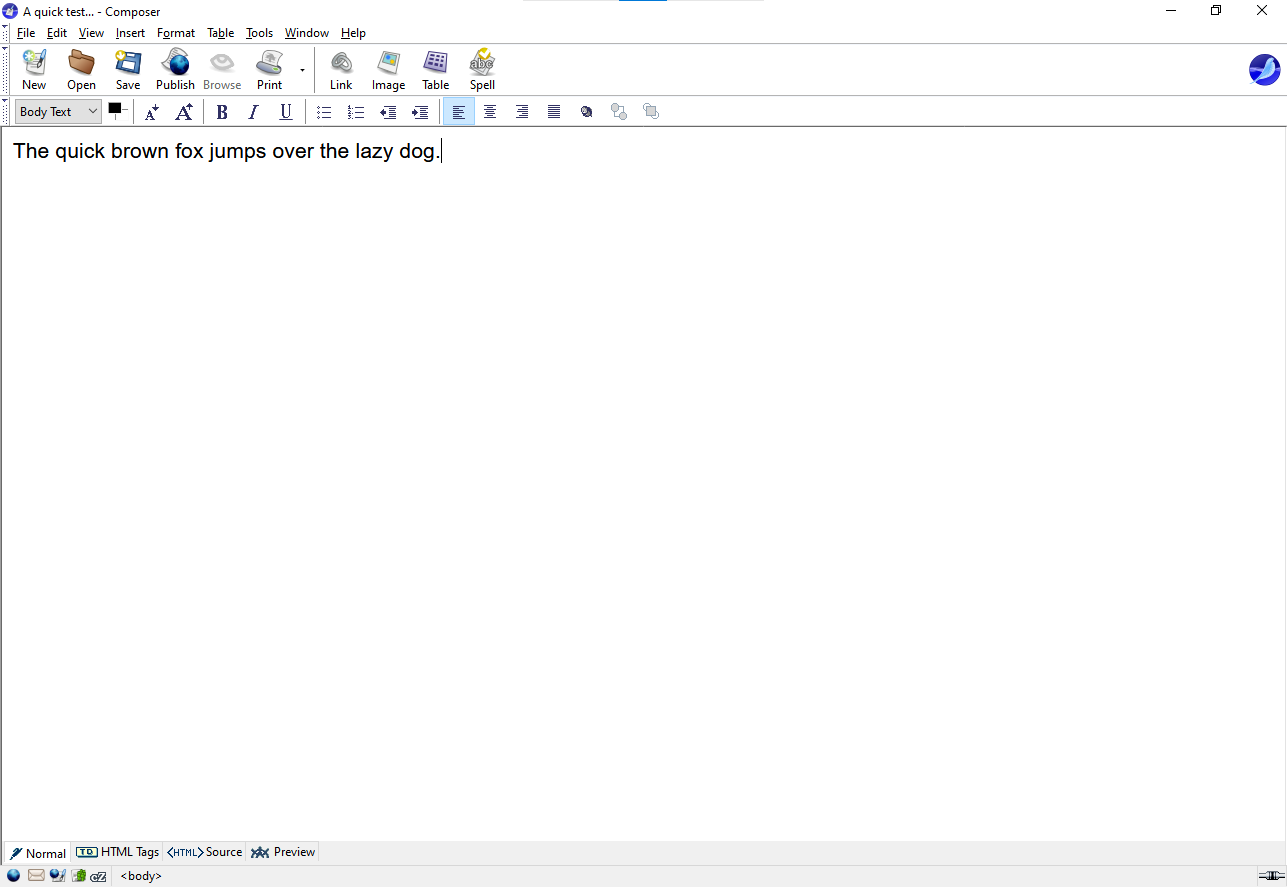
SeaMonkey Composer 2.53.17.1

SeaMonkey Composer is a WYSIWYG HTML editor descended from Mozilla Composer. Its main user interface features four tabs: Normal (WYSIWYG), HTML tags, HTML code, and browser preview. The generated code is HTML 4.01 Transitional.

== Naming ==
To avoid confusing organizations that still want to use the original Mozilla Application Suite, the new product needed a new name. After initial speculation by members of the community, a July 2, 2005 announcement confirmed that SeaMonkey would officially become the name of the Internet suite superseding the Mozilla Application Suite.

"Seamonkey" (with a lowercase "m") refers to brine shrimp and had been used by Netscape and the Mozilla Foundation as a code name for the never-released Netscape Communicator 5 and later the Mozilla Application Suite itself. Originally, the name "Seamonkey" was derived by Netscape management to replace "Buttmonkey", which their developers had chosen following an internal contest for the code name.

The SeaMonkey Council has now trademarked the name with help from the Mozilla Foundation. The project uses a separate numbering scheme, with the first release being called SeaMonkey 1.0. Despite having a different name and version number, SeaMonkey 1.0 is based on the same code as Mozilla Application Suite 1.7.

For trademark and copyright reasons, Debian rebranded SeaMonkey and distributed it as Iceape until 2013.

== History ==
On March 10, 2005, the Mozilla Foundation announced that it would not release any official versions of Mozilla Application Suite beyond 1.7.x, since it had now focused on the standalone applications Firefox and Thunderbird. However, the Foundation emphasized that it would still provide infrastructure for community members who wished to continue development. In effect, this meant that the suite would still continue to be developed, but now by the SeaMonkey Council instead of the Mozilla Foundation.

SeaMonkey was first released on September 15, 2005. SeaMonkey 1 was released on January 30, 2006.

Core Mozilla project source code was licensed under a disjunctive tri-license (before changing to MPL 2.0) that gave the choice of one of the three following sets of licensing terms: Mozilla Public License, version 1.1 or later, GNU General Public License, version 2.0 or later, GNU Lesser General Public License, version 2.1 or later.

== Release history ==
Parts of this table are based on the SeaMonkey release notes, and status meetings.

Legend:
Unsupported
Latest version
Preview version

Release history
Gecko branch	Version	Release date	Significant changes
1.8.0	1.0	January 30, 2006	Official version 1.0 release.
1.8.0	1.0.1	April 13, 2006	Security updates and native support for Intel-based Macintosh computers, via Universal Binary.
1.8.0	1.0.2	June 1, 2006	Stability improvement and security fixes.
1.8.0	1.0.3	July 27, 2006	Stability improvement and security fixes.
1.8.0	1.0.4	August 2, 2006	Small fix for a regression with the Microsoft Media Server protocol in 1.0.3.
1.8.0	1.0.5	September 14, 2006	Stability improvement and security fixes.
1.8.0	1.0.6	November 8, 2006	Stability improvement and security fixes.
1.8.0	1.0.7	December 20, 2006	Stability improvement and security fixes.
1.8.0	1.0.8	February 27, 2007	Stability improvement and security fixes.
1.8.0	1.0.9	May 30, 2007	Stability improvement and security fixes. Marks the end of life for SeaMonkey 1.0.x series.
1.8.1	1.1	January 18, 2007	Official version 1.1 release. Major feature work
1.8.1	1.1.1	February 28, 2007	Stability improvement and security fixes.
1.8.1	1.1.2	May 30, 2007	Stability improvement and security fixes.
1.8.1	1.1.3	July 19, 2007	Stability improvement and security fixes.
1.8.1	1.1.4	August 3, 2007	Stability improvement and security fixes.
1.8.1	1.1.5	October 19, 2007	Stability improvement and security fixes.
1.8.1	1.1.6	November 5, 2007	Several small problems in displaying certain web pages corrected
1.8.1	1.1.7	November 30, 2007	Stability improvement and security fixes. Problem with running SeaMonkey from read-only application directories corrected. The last to be built for Solaris 8.
1.8.1	1.1.8	February 7, 2008	Stability improvement and security fixes.
1.8.1	1.1.9	March 25, 2008	Stability improvement and security fixes.
1.8.1	1.1.10	July 2, 2008	Stability improvement and security fixes.
1.8.1	1.1.11	July 15, 2008	Stability improvement and security fixes.
1.8.1	1.1.12	September 23, 2008	Stability improvement and security fixes.
1.8.1	1.1.13	November 12, 2008	Stability improvement and security fixes.
1.8.1	1.1.14	December 16, 2008	Stability improvement and security fixes.
1.8.1	1.1.15	March 18, 2009	Stability improvement and security fixes.
1.8.1	1.1.16	April 8, 2009	Stability improvement and security fixes.
1.8.1	1.1.17	June 22, 2009	Stability improvement and security fixes.
1.8.1	1.1.18	September 3, 2009	Stability improvement and security fixes.
1.8.1	1.1.19	March 16, 2010	Stability improvement and security fixes. End-of-life of 1.1.x product line. The last to support Windows 98/Me. The last to be built for Solaris 10.
1.9.1	2.0	October 27, 2009	Official version 2.0 release.
1.9.1	2.0.1	December 15, 2009	Stability improvement and security fixes.
1.9.1	2.0.2	January 11, 2010	Stability improvement and security fixes.
1.9.1	2.0.3	February 17, 2010	Stability improvement and security fixes.
1.9.1	2.0.4	March 30, 2010	Stability improvement and security fixes.
1.9.1	2.0.5	June 22, 2010	Stability improvement and security fixes.
1.9.1	2.0.6	July 20, 2010	Stability improvement and security fixes.
1.9.1	2.0.7	September 7, 2010	Stability improvement and security fixes.
1.9.1	2.0.8	September 15, 2010	Stability improvements only.
1.9.1	2.0.9	October 20, 2010	Stability improvement and security fixes.
1.9.1	2.0.10	October 28, 2010	Security fix.
1.9.1	2.0.11	December 9, 2010	Stability improvement and security fixes.
1.9.1	2.0.12	March 2, 2011	Security fix.
1.9.1	2.0.13	March 23, 2011	Stability improvement and security fixes.
1.9.1	2.0.14	April 28, 2011	Stability improvement and security fixes. This is the last version to support Mac OS X 10.4 Tiger and PowerPC Macs
2.0	2.1	June 10, 2011	Official version 2.1 release. The last to be built for OS/2.
5.0	2.2	July 7, 2011	Official version 2.2 release.
6.0	2.3	August 16, 2011	Official version 2.3 release.
6.0	2.3.1	August 23, 2011	Official version 2.3.1 release. Added a security certificate in order to avoid disabling future automatic software updates.
6.0	2.3.2	August 31, 2011	Official version 2.3.2 release. Removed root certificate for Diginotar. Many downloads erroneously identify themselves as version 2.3.1.
6.0	2.3.3	September 6, 2011	Official version 2.3.3 release. Removed trust exceptions for certificates issued by Staat der Nederlanden. Fixed an error with .gov.uk domains.
7.0	2.4	September 27, 2011	Official version 2.4 release.
7.0	2.4.1	September 29, 2011	Official version 2.4.1 release.
8.0	2.5	November 22, 2011	Official version 2.5 release.
9.0	2.6	December 20, 2011	Official version 2.6 release.
9.0	2.6.1	December 22, 2011	Official version 2.6.1 release.
10.0	2.7	January 31, 2012	Official version 2.7 release.
10.0	2.7.1	February 10, 2012	Official version 2.7.1 release.
10.0	2.7.2	February 17, 2012	Official version 2.7.2 release.
11.0	2.8	March 13, 2012	Official version 2.8 release.
12.0	2.9	April 24, 2012	Official version 2.9 release.
12.0	2.9.1	April 30, 2012	Official version 2.9.1 release. This is the last version to support Windows 2000.
13.0	2.10	June 6, 2012	Official version 2.10 release. Introduction of tabs lazy loading.
13.0	2.10.1	June 16, 2012	Official version 2.10.1 release.
14.0	2.11	July 17, 2012	Official version 2.11 release.
15.0	2.12	August 28, 2012	Official version 2.12 release.
15.0	2.12.1	September 10, 2012	Official version 2.12.1 release.
16.0	2.13	October 9, 2012	Official version 2.13 release.
16.0	2.13.1	October 12, 2012	Official version 2.13.1 release.
16.0	2.13.2	October 27, 2012	Official version 2.13.2 release. Last version supported on Mac OS X 10.5
17.0	2.14	November 9, 2012	Official version 2.14.
17.0	2.14.1	November 30, 2012	Official version 2.14.1.
18.0	2.15	January 8, 2013	Official version 2.15 release.
18.0	2.15.1	January 20, 2013	Official version 2.15.1 release.
18.0	2.15.2	February 4, 2013	Official version 2.15.2 release.
19.0	2.16	February 21, 2013	Official version 2.16 release.
19.0	2.16.1	March 8, 2013	Official version 2.16.1 release.
19.0	2.16.2	March 13, 2013	Official version 2.16.2 release.
20.0	2.17	April 2, 2013	Official version 2.17 release.
20.0	2.17.1	April 14, 2013	Official version 2.17.1 release.
22.0	2.19	July 2, 2013	Official version 2.19 release.
23.0	2.20	August 6, 2013	Official version 2.20 release. TLS 1.1 support.
24.0	2.21	September 17, 2013	Official version 2.21 release. TLS 1.2 support.
25.0	2.22	October 30, 2013	Official version 2.22 release.
25.0	2.22.1	November 18, 2013	Official version 2.22.1 release.
26.0	2.23	December 12, 2013	Official version 2.23 release.
27.0	2.24	February 6, 2014	Official version 2.24 release.
28.0	2.25	March 19, 2014	Official version 2.25 release.
29.0	2.26	May 2, 2014	Official version 2.26.0 release.
29.0	2.26.1	June 16, 2014	Official version 2.26.1 release.
32.0	2.29	September 7, 2014	Official version 2.29 release.
32.0	2.29.1	September 24, 2014	Official version 2.29.1 release.
33.0	2.30	October 15, 2014	Official version 2.30 release.
34.0	2.31	December 4, 2014	Official version 2.31 release.
35.0	2.32	January 13, 2015	Official version 2.32 release.
35.0	2.32.1	February 6, 2015	Official version 2.32.1 release.
36.0	2.33	March 10, 2015	Official version 2.33 release.
36.0	2.33.1	March 24, 2015	Official version 2.33.1 release.
38.0	2.35	September 3, 2015	Official version 2.35 release.
41.0	2.38	September 26, 2015	Official version 2.38 release.
42.0	2.39	November 8, 2015	Official version 2.39 release.
43.0	2.40	March 14, 2016	Official version 2.40 release. This is the last version to support CPUs without SSE2 under Windows. This is the last version to support Mac OS X 10.6-10.8.
49.0	2.46	December 22, 2016	Official version 2.46 release.
51.0	2.48	July 31, 2017	Official version 2.48 release. This is the last version to support GTK2 on Linux.
52.4	2.49.1	November 4, 2017	Official version 2.49.1 release. Built from the same Extended Support Release (ESR) branch as Firefox 52 ESR and Thunderbird 52.
52.6	2.49.2	February 15, 2018	Official version 2.49.2 release. Built from the same Extended Support Release (ESR) branch as Firefox 52 ESR and Thunderbird 52.
52.7.3	2.49.3	May 4, 2018	Official version 2.49.3 release. Built from the same Extended Support Release (ESR) branch as Firefox 52 ESR and Thunderbird 52.
52.9.1	2.49.4	July 27, 2018	Official version 2.49.4 release. Built from the same Extended Support Release (ESR) branch as Firefox 52 ESR and Thunderbird 52. This is the last version to support plugins other than Flash on macOS.
52.9.1	2.49.5	September 4, 2019	Official version 2.49.5 release. Built from the same Extended Support Release (ESR) branch as Firefox 52 ESR and Thunderbird 52. This is the last version to support Windows XP/Server 2003 and Windows Vista/Server 2008. This is the last version to support ALSA on Linux. This is the last version to support NPAPI plugins other than Flash.
60.3 and later	2.53.1	February 28, 2020	Updates backported from multiple Extended Support Release (ESR) branches.
60.3 and later	2.53.2	May 3, 2020	Updates backported from multiple Extended Support Release (ESR) branches.
60.4 and later	2.53.3	July 7, 2020	Updates backported from multiple Extended Support Release (ESR) branches.
60.6 and later	2.53.4	September 22, 2020	Updates backported from multiple Extended Support Release (ESR) branches.
60.8 and later	2.53.5	November 13, 2020	Updates backported from multiple Extended Support Release (ESR) branches.
60.8 and later	2.53.5.1	November 17, 2020	Updates backported from multiple Extended Support Release (ESR) branches.
60.8 and later	2.53.6	January 22, 2021	Last version to include support for NPAPI plugins.
60.8 and later	2.53.7	March 10, 2021	Updates backported from multiple Extended Support Release (ESR) branches.
60.8 and later	2.53.7.1	April 15, 2021	Updates backported from multiple Extended Support Release (ESR) branches.
60.8 and later	2.53.8	June 30, 2021	Updates backported from multiple Extended Support Release (ESR) branches.
60.8 and later	2.53.9	August 26, 2021	Updates backported from multiple Extended Support Release (ESR) branches.
60.8 and later	2.53.9.1	September 28, 2021	Updates backported from multiple Extended Support Release (ESR) branches.
60.8 and later	2.53.10	November 16, 2021	Updates backported from multiple Extended Support Release (ESR) branches.
60.8 and later	2.53.10.1	December 13, 2021	Updates backported from multiple Extended Support Release (ESR) branches.
60.8 and later	2.53.10.2	December 28, 2021	Updates backported from multiple Extended Support Release (ESR) branches.
60.8 and later	2.53.11	March 2, 2022	Updates backported from multiple Extended Support Release (ESR) branches.
60.8 and later	2.53.11.1	March 25, 2022	Updates backported from multiple Extended Support Release (ESR) branches.
60.8 and later	2.53.12	May 4, 2022	Updates backported from multiple Extended Support Release (ESR) branches.
60.8 and later	2.53.13	July 11, 2022	Updates backported from multiple Extended Support Release (ESR) branches.
60.8 and later	2.53.14	September 29, 2022	Updates backported from multiple Extended Support Release (ESR) branches.
60.8 and later	2.53.15	January 20, 2023	Updates backported from multiple Extended Support Release (ESR) branches.
60.8 and later	2.53.16	March 31, 2023	Updates backported from multiple Extended Support Release (ESR) branches.
60.8 and later	2.53.17	August 4, 2023	Updates backported from multiple Extended Support Release (ESR) branches.
60.8 and later	2.53.17.1	September 20, 2023	Updates backported from multiple Extended Support Release (ESR) branches.
60.8 and later	2.53.18	December 9, 2023	Updates backported from multiple Extended Support Release (ESR) branches.
60.8 and later	2.53.18.1	January 16, 2024	Updates backported from multiple Extended Support Release (ESR) branches.
60.8 and later	2.53.18.2	March 28, 2024	Updates backported from multiple Extended Support Release (ESR) branches.
60.8 and later	2.53.19	September 4, 2024	Updates backported from multiple Extended Support Release (ESR) branches.
60.8 and later	2.53.20	January 7, 2025	Updates backported from multiple Extended Support Release (ESR) branches.
60.8 and later	2.53.21	June 5, 2025	This is the last version to support 32-bit editions.
60.8 and later	2.53.22	October 31, 2025	Updates backported from multiple Extended Support Release (ESR) branches.
60.8 and later	2.53.23	December 31, 2025	Official version 2.53.23 release. Built from the same Extended Support Release (ESR) branch as Firefox 60 ESR and Thunderbird 60. This is the last version to support Windows 7/Server 2008 R2, Windows 8/Server 2012 and Windows 8.1/Server 2012 R2.

== See also ==
- Comparison of IRC clients
- Comparison of Usenet newsreaders
- Java Embedding Plugin
- List of free and recommended Mozilla WebExtensions
- List of Usenet newsreaders
- Mozilla Composer
- Timeline of web browsers
- K-Meleon
- Pale Moon
