= Netscape =

American computer services company

Netscape Communications Corporation
- Formerly: Mosaic Communications Corporation
- Type: Subsidiary
- Industry: Internet, software, and telecommunication
- Founded: April 4, 1994; 32 years ago
- Founder: Marc Andreessen and Jim Clark
- Defunct: March 1, 2008; 18 years ago
- Fate: Dissolved
- Headquarters: United States
- Key people: James L. Barksdale (CEO)
- Products: Internet suite Web browser Internet service provider Web portal
- Number of employees: 2,500 (1999)
- Parent: AOL Media LLC
- Website: www.mcom.com

Netscape Communications Corporation (originally Mosaic Communications Corporation) was an American independent computer services company with headquarters in Mountain View, California, and then Dulles, Virginia. Its Netscape web browser was once dominant, but lost to Internet Explorer and other competitors in the first browser war, with its market share falling from more than 90 percent in the mid-1990s to less than one percent in 2006. An early Netscape employee, Brendan Eich, created the JavaScript programming language, the most widely used language for client-side scripting of web pages. A founding engineer of Netscape, Lou Montulli, created HTTP cookies. The company also developed SSL which was used for securing online communications and was later renamed to TLS.

Netscape stock traded from 1995 until 1999 when the company was acquired by AOL in a pooling-of-interests transaction ultimately worth US$10 billion. In February 1998, approximately one year before its acquisition by AOL, Netscape released the source code for its browser and created the Mozilla Organization to coordinate future development of its product. The Mozilla Organization rewrote the entire browser's source code based on the Gecko rendering engine, and all future Netscape releases were based on this rewritten code. When AOL scaled back its involvement with Mozilla Organization in the early 2000s, the Organization proceeded to establish the Mozilla Foundation in July 2003 to ensure its continued independence with financial and other assistance from AOL. The Gecko engine is used to power the Mozilla Foundation's Firefox browser.

In addition to browsers, Netscape developed a suite of award-winning server software, known as SuiteSpot, to power enterprise Internet and Intranet websites, forums, and email; e-commerce software; and a consumer web portal named Netcenter. Netscape's browser development continued until December 2007, when AOL announced that the company would stop supporting it by early 2008. Until 2025, AOL used the Netscape brand to market a discount Internet service provider, which itself provided a Chromium-based web browser called Netscape, developed by UK security firm SentryBay. This Internet service provider was discontinued on November 30, 2025.

== History ==
=== Early years ===
Netscape Communications wants you to forget all the highway metaphors you've ever heard about the Internet. Instead, think about an encyclopedia—one with unlimited, graphically rich pages, connections to Email and files, and access to Internet newsgroups and online shopping.

— Netscape Navigator, Macworld (May 1995)

Mosaic was developed at the tax payer funded National Center for Supercomputing Applications (NCSA) at the University of Illinois at Urbana–Champaign beginning in late 1992. Mosaic became a private venture as Mosaic Communications Corporation on April 4, 1994, the brainchild of Jim Clark who had recruited Marc Andreessen as co-founder and Kleiner Perkins as investors. The first meeting between Clark and Andreessen was never truly about a software or service like Netscape, but more about a product that was similar to Nintendo. Clark recruited other early team members from SGI and NCSA Mosaic. Jim Barksdale came on board as CEO in January 1995. Jim Clark and Marc Andreessen created a 20-page concept pitch for an online gaming network to Nintendo for the Nintendo 64 console, but a deal was never reached. Marc Andreessen explains, "If they had shipped a year earlier, we probably would have done that instead of Netscape."

The company's first product was the web browser, called Mosaic Netscape 0.9, released on October 13, 1994. Within four months of its release, it had already taken three-quarters of the browser market. It became the main browser for Internet users in such a short time due to its superiority over other competition, like Mosaic. This browser was subsequently renamed Netscape Navigator, and the company took the "Netscape" name (coined by employee Greg Sands, although it was also a trademark of Cisco Systems) on November 14, 1994, to avoid trademark ownership problems with NCSA, where the initial Netscape employees had previously created the NCSA Mosaic web browser. The Mosaic Netscape web browser did not use any NCSA Mosaic code. The internal codename for the company's browser was Mozilla, which stood for "Mosaic killer", as the company's goal was to displace NCSA Mosaic as the world's number one web browser. A cartoon Godzilla-like lizard mascot was drawn by artist-employee Dave Titus, which went well with the theme of crushing the competition. The Mozilla mascot featured prominently on Netscape's website in the company's early years. However, the need to project a more "professional" image (especially towards corporate clients) led to this being removed. Netscape eventually became the first company to attempt to capitalize on the emerging World Wide Web.

=== Initial public offering (IPO) ===
The original green and purple Mozilla mascot, a Godzilla-like lizard which represented the company's goal of producing the browser that would be the "Mosaic killer"

On August 9, 1995, Netscape made an extremely successful IPO, only sixteen months after the company was formed. The stock was set to be offered at US$14 per share, but a last-minute decision doubled the initial offering to US$28 per share. The stock's value soared to US$75 during the first day of trading, nearly a record for first-day gain. The stock closed at US$58.25, which gave Netscape a market value of US$2.9 billion. It was listed on the NASDAQ under the symbol NSCP. While it was somewhat unusual for a company to go public before becoming profitable, Netscape's revenues had, in fact, doubled every quarter in 1995. The success of this IPO subsequently inspired the use of the term "Netscape moment" to describe a high-visibility IPO that signals the dawn of a new industry. During this period, Netscape also pursued a publicity strategy (crafted by Rosanne Siino, then head of public relations), packaging Andreessen as the company's "rock star." The events of this period ultimately landed Andreessen, barefoot, on the cover of Time magazine. The IPO also helped kickstart widespread investment in internet companies that created the dot-com bubble.

It is alleged that several Microsoft executives visited the Netscape campus in June 1995 to propose dividing the market (an allegation denied by Microsoft and, if true, would have breached antitrust laws), which would have allowed Microsoft to produce web browser software for Windows while leaving all other operating systems to Netscape. Netscape refused the proposition. Microsoft released version 1.0 of Internet Explorer as a part of the Windows 95 Plus Pack add-on. According to former Spyglass developer Eric Sink, Internet Explorer was based not on NCSA Mosaic as commonly believed, but on a version of Mosaic developed at Spyglass (which itself was based upon NCSA Mosaic).

This era would become known as the browser wars. Netscape Navigator was not free to the general public until January 1998, while Internet Explorer and Internet Information Server have always been free or came bundled with an operating system and/or other applications. Meanwhile, Netscape faced increasing criticism for "featuritis" – putting a higher priority on adding new features than on making their products work properly. Netscape experienced its first bad quarter at the end of 1997 and underwent a large round of layoffs in January 1998. Former Netscape executives Mike Homer and Peter Currie have described this period as "hectic and crazy" and that the company was undone by factors both internal and external. In January 1998, Netscape started the open source Mozilla project. Netscape publicly released the source code of Netscape Communicator 5.0 under the Netscape Public License, which was similar to the GNU General Public License but allowed Netscape to continue to publish proprietary work containing the publicly released code.

The United States Department of Justice filed an antitrust case against Microsoft in May 1998. Netscape was not a plaintiff in the case, though its executives were subpoenaed and it contributed much material to the case, including the entire contents of the 'Bad Attitude' internal discussion forum.

=== Acquisition by America Online ===
On November 24, 1998, America Online (AOL) announced it would acquire Netscape Communications in a tax-free stock swap valued at US$4.2 billion. By the time the deal closed on March 17, 1999, it was valued at US$10 billion. This merger was ridiculed by many who believed that the two corporate cultures could not possibly mesh; one of its most prominent critics was longtime Netscape developer Jamie Zawinski.

=== Disbanding ===
During Netscape's acquisition by AOL, joint development and marketing of Netscape software products would occur through the Sun-Netscape Alliance. In the newly branded iPlanet, the software included "messaging and calendar, collaboration, web, application, directory, and certificate servers", as well as "production-ready applications for e-commerce, including commerce exchange, procurement, selling, and billing." In March 2002, when the alliance was ended, "iPlanet became a division of Sun... Sun retained the intellectual property rights for all products and the engineering"

On July 15, 2003, Time Warner (formerly AOL Time Warner) disbanded Netscape. Most of the programmers were laid off, and the Netscape logo was removed from the building. However, the Netscape 7.2 web browser (developed in-house rather than with Netscape staff, with some work outsourced to Sun's Beijing development center) was released by AOL on August 18, 2004.

After the Sun acquisition by Oracle in January 2010, Oracle continued to sell iPlanet-branded applications, which originated from Netscape.

=== Final release of the browser ===
Netscape logo 2005–2007

The Netscape brand name continued to be used extensively. The company once again had its own programming staff devoted to the development and support for the series of web browsers. Additionally, Netscape also maintained the Propeller web portal, which was a popular social-news site, similar to Digg, which was given a new look in June 2006. AOL marketed a discount ISP service under the Netscape brand name.

A new version of the Netscape browser, Netscape Navigator 9, based on Firefox 2, was released in October 2007. It featured a green and grey interface. In November 2007, IE had 77.4% of the browser market, Firefox 16.0%, and Netscape 0.6%, according to Net Applications, an Internet metrics firm. On December 28, 2007, AOL announced that it would drop support for the Netscape web browser and would no longer develop new releases on February 1, 2008. The date was later extended to March 1 to allow a major security update and to add a tool to assist users in migrating to other browsers. These additional features were included in the final version of Netscape Navigator 9 (version 9.0.0.6), released on February 20, 2008.

== Software ==
=== Classic releases ===
==== Netscape Navigator (versions 0.9–4.08) ====
Netscape Navigator was Netscape's web browser from versions 1.0 to 4.8. The first beta versions were released in 1994 and were called Mosaic and later Mosaic Netscape. Then, a legal challenge from the National Center for Supercomputing Applications (makers of NCSA Mosaic), which many of Netscape's founders used to develop, led to the name Netscape Navigator. The company's name also changed from Mosaic Communications Corporation to Netscape Communications Corporation.

The browser was easily the most advanced available and so was an instant success, becoming a market leader while still in beta. Netscape's feature count and market share continued to grow rapidly after version 1.0 was released. Version 2.0 added a full email reader called Netscape Mail, thus transforming Netscape from a single-purpose web browser to an Internet suite. The email client's main distinguishing feature was its ability to display HTML email. During this period, the entire suite was called Netscape Navigator.

Version 3.0 of Netscape (the first beta was codenamed "Atlas") was the first to face any serious competition in the form of Microsoft Internet Explorer 3.0. But Netscape remained the most popular browser at that time.

Netscape also released a Gold version of Navigator 3.0 that incorporated WYSIWYG editing with drag and drop between web editor and email components.

==== Netscape Communicator (versions 4.0–4.8) ====
Netscape Communicator 4.61 for OS/2 Warp

Netscape 4 addressed the problem of Netscape Navigator being used as both the name of the suite and the browser contained within it by renaming the suite to Netscape Communicator. After five preview releases in 1996–1997, Netscape released the final version of Netscape Communicator in June 1997. This version, more or less based on Netscape Navigator 3 Code, updated and added new features. The new suite was successful, despite increasing competition from Internet Explorer (IE) 4.0 and problems with the outdated browser core. IE was slow and unstable on the Mac platform until version 4.5. Despite this, Apple entered into an agreement with Microsoft to make IE the default browser on new Mac OS installations, a further blow to Netscape's prestige. The Communicator suite was made up of Netscape Navigator, Netscape Mail & Newsgroups, Netscape Address Book and Netscape Composer (an HTML editor).

On January 22, 1998, Netscape Communications Corporation announced that all future versions of its software would be available free of charge and developed by an open source community, Mozilla. Netscape Communicator 5.0 was announced (codenamed "Gromit"). However, its release was greatly delayed, and meanwhile, there were newer versions of Internet Explorer, starting with version 4. These had more features than the old Netscape version, including better support of HTML 4, CSS, DOM, and ECMAScript; eventually, the more advanced Internet Explorer 5.0 became the market leader.

In October 1998, Netscape Communicator 4.5 was released. It featured various functionality improvements, especially in the Mail and Newsgroups component, but did not update the browser core, whose functionality was essentially identical to that of version 4.08. One month later, Netscape Communications Corporation was bought by AOL. In November, work on Netscape 5.0 was canceled in favor of developing a completely new program from scratch.

==== Netscape 5 ====
In 1998, an informal group called the Mozilla Organization was formed and largely funded by Netscape (the vast majority of programmers working on the code were paid by Netscape) to coordinate the development of Netscape 5 (codenamed "Gromit"), which would be based on the Communicator source code. However, the aging Communicator code proved difficult to work with, and the decision was taken to scrap Netscape 5 and rewrite the source code.

=== Mozilla-based releases ===
==== Netscape 6 (versions 6.0–6.2.3) ====
When rewriting the source code, they had chosen to base it on the Mozilla web browser, which, with a few additions and modifications, got Netscape 6 out. At first, it had performance and stability issues, but they were mitigated by subsequent updates, such as versions 6.1 and 6.2.

==== Netscape 7 (versions 7.0–7.2) ====
Netscape 7.0 (based on Mozilla 1.0.1) was released in August 2002 as a direct continuation of Netscape 6 with very similar components. It picked up a few users, but was still very much a minority browser. It did, however, come with the popular Radio@Netscape Internet radio client. AOL had decided to deactivate Mozilla's pop-up blocker functionality in Netscape 7.0, which created outrage in the community. AOL reversed the decision and allowed Netscape to reinstate the pop-up blocker for Netscape 7.01. Netscape also introduced a new AOL-free version (without the usual AOL add-ons) of the browser suite. Netscape 7.1 (codenamed "Buffy" and based on Mozilla 1.4) was released in June 2003.

In 2003, AOL closed down its Netscape division and laid off or reassigned all of Netscape's employees. Mozilla.org continued, however, as the independent Mozilla Foundation, taking on many of Netscape's ex-employees. AOL continued to develop Netscape in-house (with help from Sun's Beijing development center), but, due to there being no staff committed to it, improvements were minimal. One year later, in August 2004, the last version based on Mozilla was released: Netscape 7.2, based on Mozilla 1.7.2.

After an official poll posted on Netscape's community support board in late 2006, speculation arose of the Netscape 7 series of suites being fully supported and updated by Netscape's in-house development team.

=== Mozilla Firefox-based releases ===
==== Netscape Browser (version 8.0–8.1.3) ====
Between 2005 and 2007, Netscape's releases became known as Netscape Browser. AOL chose to base Netscape Browser on the relatively successful Mozilla Firefox, a rewritten version of Mozilla produced by the Mozilla Foundation. This release is not a full Internet suite as before, but is solely a web browser.

Other controversial decisions include the browser only being released for Microsoft Windows and featuring both the Gecko rendering engine of previous releases and the Trident engine used in Internet Explorer, and switching between them based on a "compatibility list" that came with the browser. This effectively exposed users to the security vulnerabilities in both and resulted in a completely different user experience based on which site they were on. Examples are handling of right-to-left or bi-directional text, user interface widgets, bugs, and web standards violations in Trident, etc. On top of this, Netscape Browser 8 even broke Internet Explorer's ability to open XML files by damaging a Windows Registry key, and would do so every time it was opened, even if the user fixed it manually.

AOL's acquisition of Netscape Communications in November 1998 made it less of a surprise when the company laid off the Netscape team and outsourced development to Mercurial Communications. Netscape Browser 8.1.3 was released on April 2, 2007, and included general bug fixes identified in versions 8.0–8.1.2

==== Netscape Navigator (version 9.0) ====
Netscape Navigator 9.0

Netscape Navigator 9's features were said to include newsfeed support and become more integrated with the Propeller Internet portal, alongside more enhanced methods of discussion, submission and voting on web pages. It also sees the browser return to multi-platform support across Windows, Linux and Mac OS X. Like Netscape version 8.x, the new release was based upon the popular Mozilla Firefox (version 2.0), and supposedly had full support of all Firefox add-ons and plugins, some of which Netscape was already providing. A beta of the program was first released on June 5, 2007. The final version was released on October 15, 2007. It was the first time the browser was produced in-house with its own programming staff since 2004.

=== End of development and support ===
AOL officially announced that support for Netscape Navigator would end on March 1, 2008, and recommended that its users download either the Flock or Firefox browsers, both of which were based on the same technology.

The decision met mixed reactions from communities, with many arguing that the termination of product support is significantly belated. Internet security site Security Watch stated that a trend of infrequent security updates for AOL's Netscape caused the browser to become a "security liability", specifically the 2005–2007 versions, Netscape Browser 8. Asa Dotzler, one of Firefox's original bug testers, greeted the news with "good riddance" in his blog post, but praised the various members of the Netscape team over the years for enabling the creation of Mozilla in 1998. Others protested and petitioned AOL to continue providing vital security fixes to unknowing or loyal users of its software, as well as protection of a well-known brand.

=== Mozilla Thunderbird-based releases ===
==== Netscape Messenger 9 ====
On June 11, 2007, Netscape announced Netscape Mercury, a standalone email and news client that was to accompany Navigator 9. Mercury was based on Mozilla Thunderbird. The product was later renamed Netscape Messenger 9, and an alpha version was released. In December 2007, AOL announced it was canceling Netscape's development of Messenger 9 as well as Navigator 9.

== Product list ==
=== Initial product line ===
Netscape's initial product line consisted of:

- Netscape Navigator web browser for Windows, Macintosh, OS/2, Unix, and Linux
- Netsite Communications web server, with a web-based configuration interface
- Netsite Commerce web server, the Communications server with SSL (https) added
- Netscape Proxy Server
- Netscape Merchant System, an e-commerce platform that supported multiple languages & currencies

=== Later Netscape products ===
Netscape's later products included:

- Netscape Personal Edition (the browser, along with PPP software and an account creation wizard to sign up with an ISP)
- Netscape Communicator (a suite which included Navigator along with tools for mail, news, calendar, VoIP, and composing web pages, and was bundled with AOL Instant Messenger and RealAudio)
- Netscape FastTrack and Enterprise web servers
- Netscape Collabra Server, a NNTP news server acquired in a purchase of Collabra Software, Inc.
- Netscape Directory Server, an LDAP server
- Netscape Messaging Server, an IMAP and POP mail server
- Netscape Certificate Server, for issuing SSL certificates
- Netscape Calendar Server, for group scheduling
- Netscape Compass Server, a search engine and spider
- Netscape Application Server, for designing web applications
- Netscape Publishing System, for running a commercial site with news articles and charging users per access
- Netscape Xpert Servers
  - ECxpert – a server for EDI message exchange
  - SellerXpert – B to B Commerce Engine
  - BuyerXpert – eProcurement Engine
  - BillerXpert – Online Bill Paying Engine
  - TradingXpert – HTML EDI transaction frontend
  - CommerceXpert – Online Retail Store engine
- Radio@Netscape and Radio@Netscape Plus

=== Propeller ===
Between June 2006 and September 2007, AOL operated Netscape's website as a social news website similar to Digg. The format did not do well as traffic dropped 55.1 percent between November 2006 and August 2007. In September 2007, AOL reverted Netscape's website to a traditional news portal, and rebranded the social news portal as "Propeller", moving the site to the domain "propeller.com." AOL shut down the Propeller website on October 1, 2010.

=== Netscape Search ===
Netscape operated a search engine, Netscape Search, which now redirects to AOL Search (which itself now merely serves Bing (formerly Google) search results). Another version of Netscape Search was incorporated into Propeller.

=== Other sites ===
Netscape also operated several country-specific Netscape portals, including Netscape Canada among others. The portal of Netscape Germany was shut down in June 2008.

The Netscape Blog was written by Netscape employees discussing the latest on Netscape products and services. Netscape NewsQuake (formerly Netscape Reports) is Netscape's news and opinion blog, including video clips and discussions. As of January 2012, no new posts have been made on either of these blogs since August 2008.

=== Netscape technologies ===
Netscape created the JavaScript web page scripting language. It also pioneered the development of push technology, which effectively allowed websites to send regular updates of information (weather, stock updates, package tracking, etc.) directly to a user's desktop (aka "webtop"); Netscape's implementation of this was named Netcaster. However, businesses quickly recognized the use of push technology to deliver ads to users, which annoyed them, so Netcaster was short-lived.

Netscape was notable for its cross-platform efforts. Its client software continued to be made available for Windows (3.1, 95, 98, NT), Macintosh, Linux, OS/2, BeOS, and many versions of Unix including DEC, Sun Solaris, BSDI, IRIX, IBM AIX, and HP-UX. Its server software was generally only available for Unix and Windows NT, though some of its servers were made available on Linux, and a version of Netscape FastTrack Server was made available for Windows 95/98. Today, most of Netscape's server offerings live on as the Sun Java System, formerly under the Sun ONE branding. Although Netscape Browser 8 was Windows only, multi-platform support exists in the Netscape Navigator 9 series of browsers.

== Prior services ==
=== Netscape Internet Service ===
Netscape ISP was a dial-up Internet service once offered at US$9.95 per month. The company served web pages in a compressed format to increase effective speeds up to 1300 kbit/s (average 500 kbit/s). The Internet service provider was later run by Verizon under the Netscape brand. The low-cost ISP was officially launched on January 8, 2004.

On November 30, 2025, Netscape ISP was discontinued.

=== Netscape.com ===
Netscape drove much traffic from various links included in the browser menus to its web properties. Some say it was very late to leverage this traffic for what would become the start of the major online portal wars.

Netscape's exclusive features, such as the Netscape Blog, Netscape NewsQuake, Netscape Navigator, My Netscape and Netscape Community pages, are less accessible from the AOL Netscape designed portal and in some countries not accessible at all without providing a full URL or completing an Internet search. The new AOL Netscape site was originally previewed in August 2007 before moving the existing site in September 2007.

Netscape.com now redirects to AOL's website, with no Netscape branding at all. Meanwhile, Netscape.co.uk now redirects to AOL Search, also with no Netscape branding at all.

=== DMOZ ===
DMOZ (from directory.mozilla.org, its original domain name, also known as the Open Directory Project or ODP), was a multilingual open content directory of World Wide Web links owned by Netscape that was constructed and maintained by a community of volunteer editors. It closed in 2017.

== See also ==
- Code Rush, a 2000 documentary about Netscape engineers
- SeaMonkey
- The Book of Mozilla
- Lou Montulli, a founding engineer of Netscape Communications, creator of HTTP cookies
- Brendan Eich, early Netscape employee, creator of JavaScript
- Jamie Zawinski, former Netscape employee
