= Mozilla Application Suite =

Internet suite

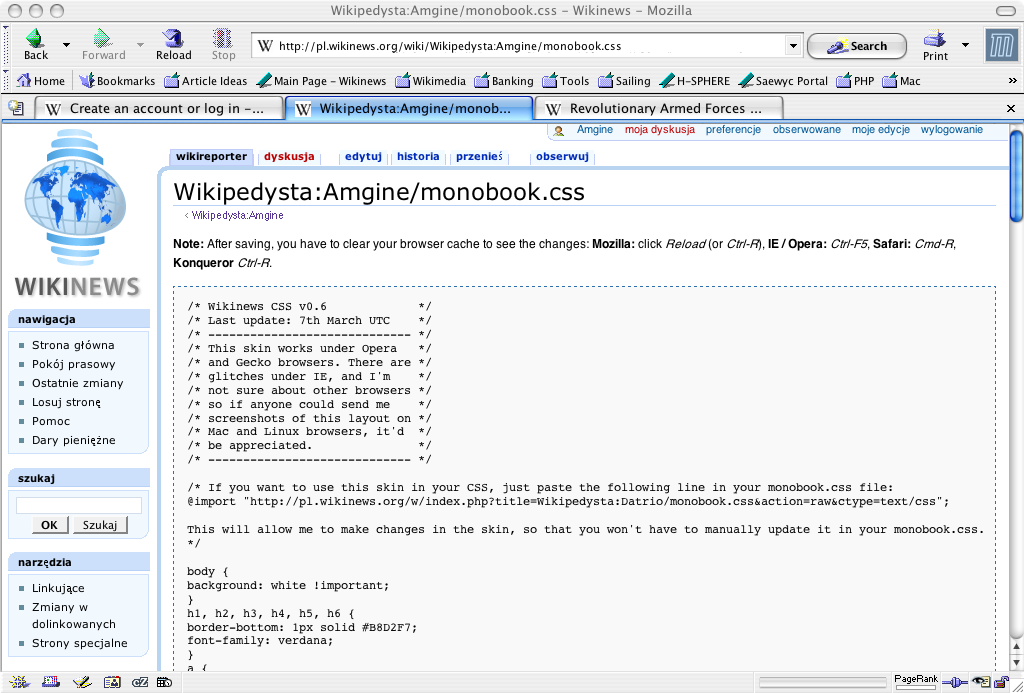
- Mozilla 1.7 displaying a page from Polish Wikinews
- Developer: Mozilla Foundation
- Final release: 1.7.13 / 21 April 2006
- Preview release: 1.8b1 / 26 February 2005
- Engine: Gecko
- Operating system: Cross-platform
- Predecessor: Netscape Communicator
- Successor: SeaMonkey
- License: Mozilla tri-license
- Website: www.mozilla.org
- Repository: dxr.mozilla.org/mozilla-central/source/

The Mozilla Application Suite (originally known as Mozilla, marketed as the Mozilla Suite) is a discontinued cross-platform integrated Internet suite. Its development was initiated by Netscape Communications Corporation, before their acquisition by AOL. It was based on the source code of Netscape Communicator. The development was led by the Mozilla Organization from 1998 to 2003, and by the Mozilla Foundation from 2003 to 2006.

The project has been superseded by the SeaMonkey Internet suite (SeaMonkey was the original code name for the project), a community-driven Internet suite that is based on the same source code, and continues to be developed with the newer Mozilla codebase.

The Mozilla Suite was composed of several main programs: Navigator (a Web browser), Communicator (Mozilla Mail & Newsgroups), a Web page developer (Mozilla Composer), an IRC client (ChatZilla) and an electronic address book. Also included were tools to synchronize the application with PalmPilot devices, and several extensions for advanced Web development, including the DOM Inspector, and Venkman (a JavaScript debugger).

Versions 6 and 7 of the Netscape suite were based on the Mozilla Suite. The last official version is 1.7.13, as Mozilla Foundation is currently focusing on the development of Firefox and Thunderbird. The Mozilla Suite is available under the terms of the Mozilla project's tri-license, as free and open-source software.

== History and development ==
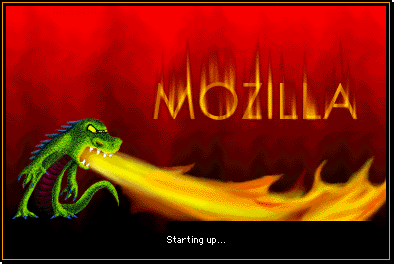
Startup screen of the Mozilla Application Suite for Mac OS 9 featuring the Mozilla mascot

In March 1998, Netscape released most of the code base for its Netscape Communicator suite under an open source license. The name of the application developed from this was Mozilla, coordinated by the newly created Mozilla Organization, at the mozilla.org web site. Although large parts of the original Communicator code, including the layout engine and front-end related codes, were abandoned shortly thereafter, the Mozilla Organization eventually produced a full-featured Internet suite that surpassed Communicator in features, stability and degree of standards compliance.

Under the AOL banner, the Mozilla Organization continued development of the browser and management of the Mozilla source until July 2003 when this task was passed to the Mozilla Foundation. The Foundation is a non-profit organization composed primarily of developers and staff from mozilla.org and owns the Mozilla trademark (but not the copyright to the source code, which is retained by the individual and corporate contributors, but licensed under the terms of the GPL and MPL). It received initial donations from AOL, IBM, Sun Microsystems, Red Hat, and Mitch Kapor. However, all official ties with AOL were severed following the announcement of the end of the Netscape Navigator browser and AOL's agreement to use Microsoft's Internet Explorer browser in future versions of its AOL software. AOL has since announced it will be using Mozilla's Gecko layout engine.

According to the Mozilla development roadmap published on April 2, 2003, the Mozilla Organization planned to focus development efforts on the new standalone applications: Phoenix (now known as Mozilla Firefox) and Minotaur (now known as Mozilla Thunderbird). To distinguish the suite from the standalone products, the suite is marketed as "Mozilla Suite" or the more lengthy "Mozilla Application Suite".

On March 10, 2005, the Mozilla Foundation announced that they would not release any further official versions of the suite beyond 1.7.x. However, the Mozilla Foundation emphasized that they would provide infrastructure for community members who wished to continue development. In effect, this means that the suite will still continue to be developed, but not by the Mozilla Foundation itself. To avoid confusing organizations that still want to use the Mozilla Suite, it was announced that the new, community-developed product would be named "SeaMonkey", with version numbers that start at "1.0".

== Features ==
=== Usability and accessibility ===
Mozilla supported tabbed browsing, which allows users to open multiple Web pages in the same browser window. Originally only available through the MultiZilla extension, the feature was then implemented directly within the browser. Early on, Mozilla adopted customizable pop-up blocking and granular cookie management, including cookie prompts.

The browser had features which helped users find information. First, Mozilla had an incremental find feature known as "find as you type". With this feature enabled, a user could begin typing a word while viewing a web page, and the browser automatically searched for it and highlighted the first instance found. As the user typed more of the word, the browser refined its search.

Additionally, Mozilla supported the "custom keyword" feature. This feature allowed users to access their bookmarks from the location bar using keywords and an optional query parameter. The built-in Bayesian e-mail spam filter could filter out unwanted e-mail spam after a period of training.

=== Customizability ===
Mozilla introduced the extension model, which was expanded and improved by Firefox and Thunderbird. Through extensions (installed via XPInstall modules), users might activate new features, such as mouse gestures, advertisement blocking, proxy server switching, and debugging tools.

One can view the extension system as a ground for experimentation, where one can test new functionalities. Occasionally, an extension, or a part of it, became part of the official product (for example MultiZilla's tabbed browsing feature eventually became part of the standard Mozilla).

Mozilla also supported a variety of themes/skins, which changed its appearance. Themes consisted of packages of CSS and image files. The Mozilla Add-ons Web site offered many themes. Beyond adding a new theme, users could customize its interface by adding and removing some of its buttons and toolbars.

Additionally, Mozilla stored most of its preferences in a list that users could access by typing about:config in the address bar. Some preferences were only available through it, like turning on bookmark icons.

=== Standards support ===
The Mozilla Foundation complied with existing standards, especially W3C Web standards. Mozilla had support for most basic standards at the time including HTML, XML, XHTML, CSS, JavaScript, DOM, MathML, DTD, XSLT and XPath.

Mozilla also supported PNG images and variable transparency, (which Internet Explorer only supported fully in version 7). Internet Explorer's lack of support for PNG images has been debated, as many web developers wanted to move away from the old GIF format, which does not have the same capabilities and image quality as PNG.

Mozilla had implemented most of CSS Level 2 and some of the not-yet-completed CSS Level 3 standard. It was among the first browsers to pass the original Box Acid Test, although it doesn't fully pass the more rigorous Acid2 test for HTML, CSS, and PNG standards support. Other browsers based on newer versions of Mozilla's core technology, however, pass the Acid2 test.

The mail and newsgroup supported POP and IMAP. It also supported LDAP address completion. Both reading and writing of HTML e-mails were supported. Mail files were stored in mbox format, and were thus portable.

The first version of the suite, i.e., the one that formed the basis of Netscape 6, did not support the blink element, thus making it the only Netscape/Mozilla browser that has not supported the tag that Netscape itself created. Later versions of the suite supported the element as well as the marquee tag, originally created by rival Internet Explorer.

=== Cross-platform support ===
Mozilla ran on a wide variety of platforms. Releases available on the primary distribution site supported the following operating systems:

- Various versions of Microsoft Windows, including 95, 98, Me, NT 4.0, 2000, XP, Server 2003, and Vista.
- Mac OS X
- Mac OS 9 (discontinued after Mozilla 1.2.1, but an unofficial Mozilla 1.3.1 is available here ). However, an updated branch of the Suite survives for the classic Mac OS in the form of Classilla.
- Linux-based operating systems using X.Org Server or XFree86
- OS/2, also known as Warpzilla

Mozilla used the same format to store users' profiles (which contain their personal browser settings) even on different operating systems, so a profile might be used on multiple platforms, as long as all of the platforms could access the profile (e.g., the profile was stored on a FAT32 partition accessible from both Windows and Linux). This functionality was useful for users who dual-boot their machines. However, it might occasionally cause problems, especially with extensions.

=== Web development tools ===
Mozilla came with three Web development tools — a DOM Inspector, Venkman and JavaScript Console. The DOM Inspector was not available in non-Mozilla browsers, and the JavaScript Console was more advanced than the consoles available in non-Mozilla browsers. Venkman was a difficult to use but decent JavaScript debugger. These were installed by default, though you could opt them out (except for the JavaScript Console) with the other install options.

=== Security ===
Mozilla was designed with security in mind. Among its key features were the use of the sandbox security model, same origin policy and external protocol whitelisting.

One key characteristic of Mozilla security was that its source code is visible to everyone. Proposed software changes were reviewed by at least one other person, and typically "super-reviewed" by yet another, and once placed in the software were visible for anyone else to consider, protest, or improve.

In addition, the Mozilla Foundation operated a "bug bounty" scheme: Users who reported a valid critical security bug received a US$500 cash reward for each report and a Mozilla T-shirt. The purpose of this "bug bounty" system, according to the Mozilla Foundation, was to "encourage more people to find and report security bugs in our products, so that we can make our products even more secure than they already are". Anyone in the world could report a bug. Also, access to the source code of Mozilla Firefox, internal design documentation, forum discussions, and other materials that could be helpful in finding bugs were available to anyone.

The Mozilla Foundation has issued a security bugs policy to help contributors to deal with security vulnerabilities. The policy restricts access to a security-related bug report to members of the security team until after Mozilla has shipped a fix for the problem. This is intended to deter the exploitation of publicly known vulnerabilities and give the developers time to issue a patch. While similar to other "responsible disclosure" policies issued by companies such as Microsoft, this policy is opposed to the full disclosure principle favored by some security researchers.

As of June 2005, Secunia had reported three unpatched vulnerabilities in Mozilla with the most serious one marked "less critical".

== Market adoption and project end ==
From 1998 to 2004, the global usage share of Mozilla grew from a negligible amount to about 3%. Because of the Foundation's plan to switch development focus to standalone applications such as Firefox and Thunderbird, many new features and enhancements were not available for Mozilla. This, combined with the community marketing effort named "Spread Firefox", drew more and more users away from Mozilla since late 2004, when Firefox 1.0 was released. There were no official releases of the Mozilla Suite beyond version 1.7.13. As of 2008, Mozilla Suite usage share was approximately 0.1%. SeaMonkey, a community-driven Internet suite that is based on the same source code, is pursued by those that appreciated Mozilla's feature set.

== See also ==
- List of web browsers
- List of Usenet newsreaders
- List of HTML editors
- Comparison of web browsers
- Comparison of email clients
- Comparison of HTML editors
- Comparison of IRC clients
- SeaMonkey

== General references ==
- Mozilla Foundation (April 2, 2003). Mozilla Development Roadmap. Retrieved June 11, 2005.
- Mozilla Foundation (March 10, 2005). Mozilla Application Suite - Transition Plan. Retrieved March 10, 2005.
- SeaMonkey Council (July 2, 2005). SeaMonkey Project Continues Internet Suite. Retrieved March 27, 2007.
