= Internet suite =

Internet-interfacing computer software bundle

An Internet suite is an Internet-related software suite. Internet suites usually include a web browser, e-mail client (often with a news client and address book), download manager, HTML editor, and an IRC client.

The diversity of Internet suite offerings was greatest in the mid-1990s, when proprietary web browser vendors felt it more profitable to sell entire retail suites of applications on compact disc. However, by the end of the first browser war, the Internet suite market dwindled to one or two competitors every few years. In reaction, alternative routes of profit or funding were sought.

Opera Software, for example, moved away from offering the Opera Internet suite with embedded advertisements to a completely ad-free product. Mozilla (spun out of Netscape) began to separate the Mozilla Application Suite into separate projects: Firefox, Thunderbird, and Sunbird, but Internet suite development continued with Seamonkey, which is still active under the Mozilla umbrella.

A further cause of depression in the diversity of Internet suites was the rise of Ajax-based web applications (webmail, for example) which replicated most functions of their desktop client equivalents while offering cross-platform portability through web browsers, portability not offered as easily by desktop clients inside Internet suites and outside web browsers.

== Examples ==
- Arachne
- Cyberdog
- Mozilla Application Suite and SeaMonkey internet suite
- Gnuzilla
- K Desktop Environment
- MSN Explorer
- Netscape Communicator
- Netscape
- Opera (version 12.18 and earlier)
- Vivaldi

== See also ==
- Comparison of web browsers
