= History of the web browser =

A web browser is a software application for retrieving, presenting and traversing information resources on the World Wide Web. It further provides for the capture or input of information which may be returned to the presenting system, then stored or processed as necessary. The method of accessing a particular page or content is achieved by entering its address, known as a Uniform Resource Identifier or URI. This may be a web page, image, video, or other piece of content. Hyperlinks present in resources enable users easily to navigate their browsers to related resources.

Precursors to the web browser emerged in the form of hyperlinked applications during the mid and late 1980s, and following these, Tim Berners-Lee is credited with developing, in 1990, both the first web server, and the first web browser, called WorldWideWeb (no spaces) and later renamed Nexus. Many others were soon developed, with Marc Andreessen's 1993 Mosaic (later Netscape), being particularly easy to use and install, and often credited with sparking the internet boom of the 1990s. Today, the major web browsers are Chrome, Safari, Firefox, Opera, and Edge.

The explosion in popularity of the Web was triggered in September 1993 by NCSA Mosaic, a graphical browser which eventually ran on several popular office and home computers. This was the first web browser aiming to bring multimedia content to non-technical users, and therefore included images and text on the same page, unlike previous browser designs; its founder, Marc Andreessen, also established the company that in 1994, released Netscape Navigator, which resulted in one of the early browser wars, when it ended up in a competition for dominance (which it lost) with Microsoft's Internet Explorer (for Windows).

== Precursors ==
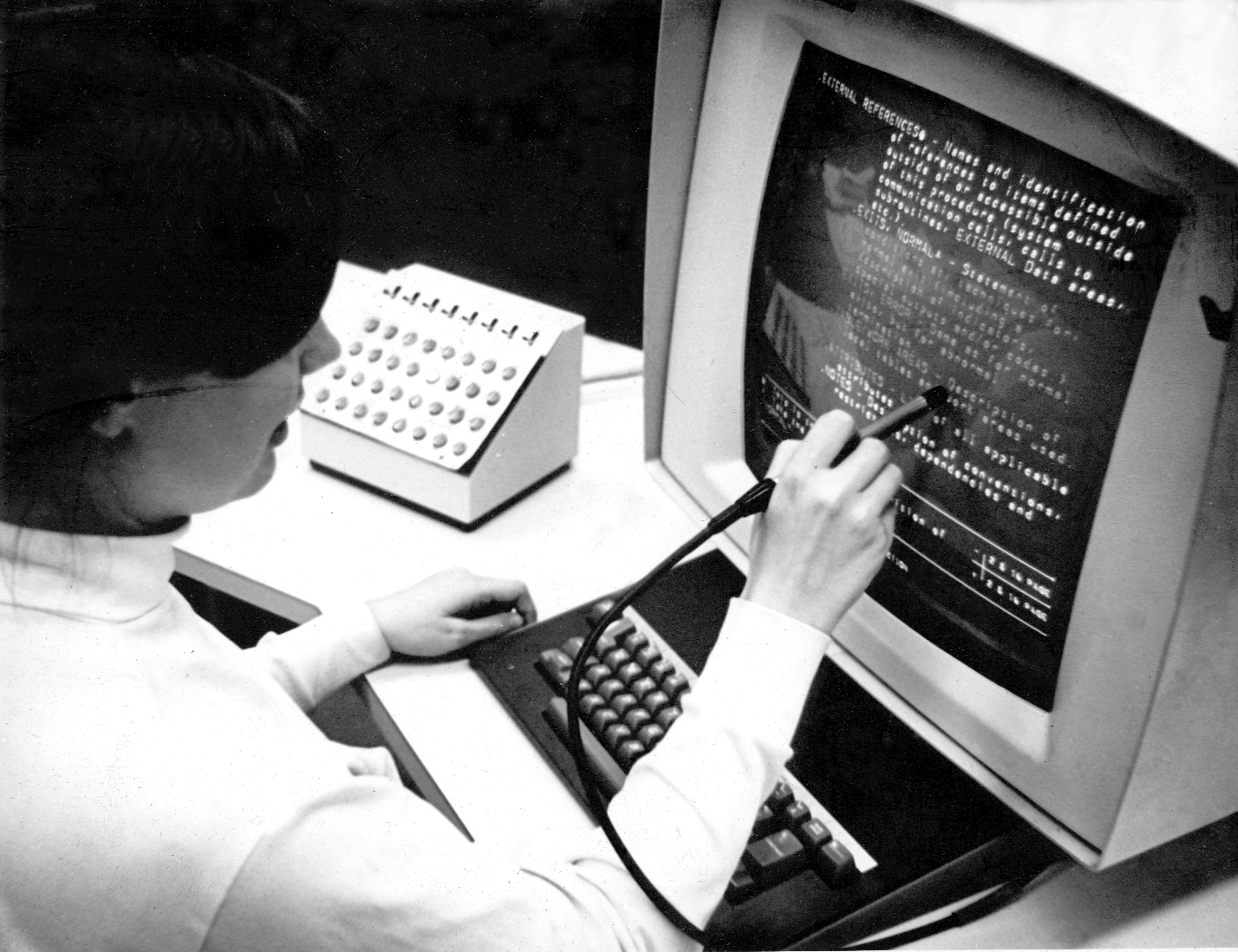
The Hypertext Editing System display console with lightpen (1969)

In 1984, expanding on ideas from futurist Ted Nelson, Neil Larson's commercial DOS MaxThink outline program added angle bracket hypertext jumps (adopted by later web browsers) to and from ASCII, batch, and other MaxThink files up to 32 levels deep. In 1986, he released his DOS Houdini knowledge network program that supported 2500 topics cross-connected with 7500 links in each file along with hypertext links among unlimited numbers of external ASCII, batch, and other Houdini files, these capabilities were included in his then popular shareware DOS file browser programs HyperRez (memory resident) and PC Hypertext (which also added jumps to programs, editors, graphic files containing hot spots jumps, and cross-linked thesaurus/glossary files). These programs introduced many to the browser concept and 20 years later, Google still lists 3,000,000 references to PC Hypertext. In 1989, Larson created both HyperBBS and HyperLan which both allow multiple users to create/edit both topics and jumps for information and knowledge annealing which, in concept, the columnist John C. Dvorak says pre-dated Wiki by many years.

From 1987 on, Neil Larson also created TransText (hypertext word processor) and many utilities for rapidly building large scale knowledge systems. In 1989, his software helped produce, for one of the big eight accounting firms, a comprehensive knowledge system (integrated litigation knowledge system) of integrating all accounting laws/regulations into a CDROM containing 50,000 files with 200,000 hypertext jumps. Additionally, the Lynx (a very early web-based browser) development history notes their project origin was based on the browser concepts from Neil Larson and Maxthink. In 1989, he declined joining the Mosaic browser team with his preference for knowledge/wisdom creation over distributing information ... a problem he says is still not solved by today's internet.

Another early browser, Silversmith, was created by John Bottoms in 1986. The browser, based on SGML tags, used a tag set from the Electronic Document Project of the AAP with minor modifications and was sold to a number of early adopters. At the time SGML was used exclusively for the formatting of printed documents. The use of SGML for electronically displayed documents signaled a shift in electronic publishing and was met with considerable resistance. Silversmith included an integrated indexer, full text searches, hypertext links between images text and sound using SGML tags and a return stack for use with hypertext links. It included features that are still not available in today's browsers. These include capabilities such as the ability to restrict searches within document structures, searches on indexed documents using wild cards and the ability to search on tag attribute values and attribute names.

Peter Scott and Earle Fogel expanded the earlier HyperRez (1988) concept in creating HyTelnet in 1990 which added jumps to telnet sites ... and which offered users instant logon and access to the online catalogs of over 5000 libraries around the world. The strength of Hytelnet was speed and simplicity in link creation/execution at the expense of a centralized worldwide source for adding, indexing, and modifying telnet links. This problem was solved by the invention of the web server.

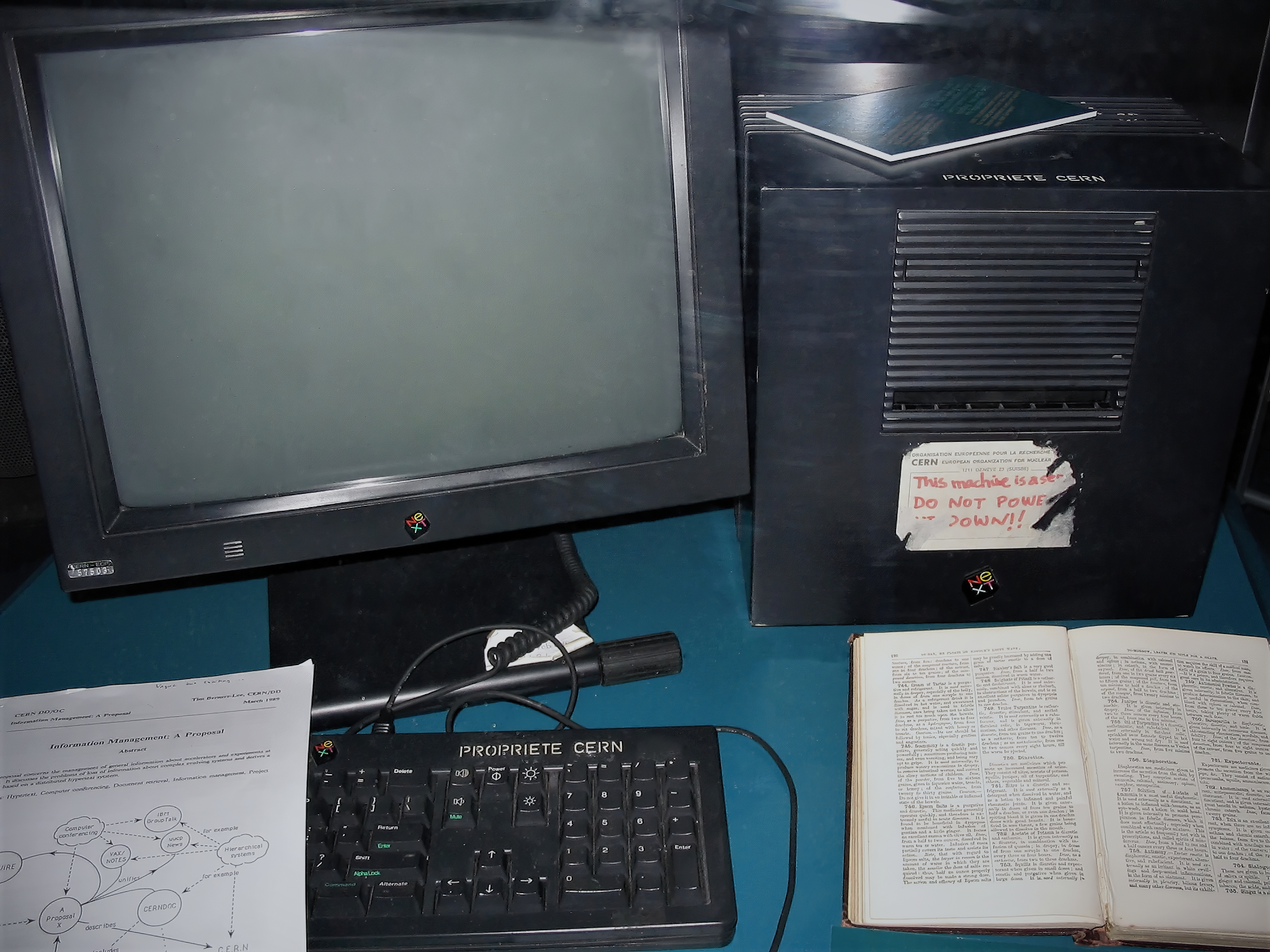
The NeXT Computer which Berners-Lee used as the first web server

== Early 1990s: world wide web ==
A graph showing the market share of Unix vs Windows browsers

The first web browser, WorldWideWeb, was developed in 1990 by Tim Berners-Lee for the NeXT Computer (at the same time as the first web server for the same machine) and introduced to his colleagues at CERN in March 1991. Berners-Lee recruited Nicola Pellow, a math student intern working at CERN, to write the Line Mode Browser, a cross-platform web browser that displayed web-pages on old terminals and was released in May 1991.

In 1992, Tony Johnson released the MidasWWW browser. Based on Motif/X, MidasWWW allowed viewing of PostScript files on the Web from Unix and VMS, and even handled compressed PostScript. Another early popular Web browser was ViolaWWW, which was modeled after HyperCard. In the same year the Lynx browser was announced – the only one of these early projects still being maintained and supported today. Erwise was the first browser with a graphical user interface, developed as a student project at Helsinki University of Technology and released in April 1992, but discontinued in 1994.

Thomas R. Bruce of the Legal Information Institute at Cornell Law School started to develop Cello in 1992. When released on 8 June 1993 it was one of the first graphical web browsers, and the first to run on Microsoft Windows (Windows 3.1, NT 3.5) and OS/2 platforms.

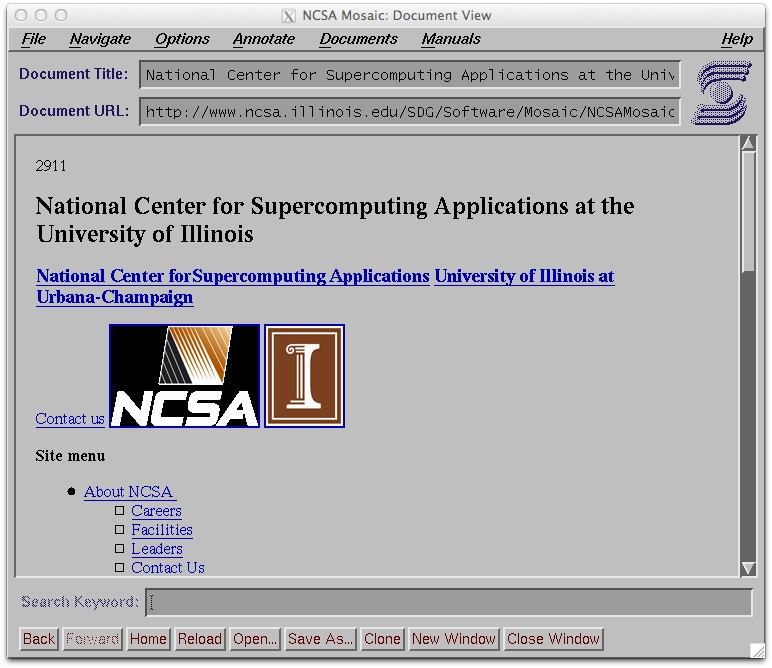
NCSA Mosaic 1.2 for Unix

However, the explosion in popularity of the Web was triggered by the graphical browser NCSA Mosaic, which was dubbed the killer application of the Internet. It was the first web browser to display images inline with the document's text. Prior browsers would display an icon that, when clicked, would download and open the graphic file in a helper application. This was an intentional design decision on both parts, as the graphics support in early browsers was intended for displaying charts and graphs associated with technical papers while the user scrolled to read the text, while Mosaic was trying to bring multimedia content to non-technical users. Mosaic and browsers derived from it had a user option to automatically display images inline or to show an icon for opening in external programs. Marc Andreessen, who was the leader of the Mosaic team at NCSA, quit to form a company that would later be known as Netscape Communications Corporation. Netscape released its flagship Navigator product in October 1994, and it took off the next year. Mosaic initially ran Unix and was soon ported to the Amiga and VMS platforms, and later the Apple Macintosh and Microsoft Windows platforms. Version 1.0 was released in September 1993.

IBM presented its own WebExplorer with OS/2 Warp in 1994 and version 1.0 was released 6 January 1995.

UdiWWW was the first web browser that was able to handle all HTML 3 features with the math tags released 1995. Following the release of version 1.2 in April 1996, Bernd Richter ceased development, stating "let Microsoft with the ActiveX Development Kit do the rest."

Microsoft, which had thus far not marketed a browser, finally entered the fray with its Internet Explorer product (version 1.0 was released 16 August 1995), purchased from Spyglass, Inc. This began what is known as the "browser wars" in which Microsoft and Netscape competed for the Web browser market.

Early web users were free to choose among the handful of web browsers available, just as they would choose any other application—web standards would ensure their experience remained largely the same. The browser wars put the Web in the hands of millions of ordinary PC users, but showed how commercialization of the Web could stymie standards efforts. Both Microsoft and Netscape liberally incorporated proprietary extensions to HTML in their products, and tried to gain an edge by product differentiation, leading to a web by the late 1990s where only Microsoft or Netscape browsers were viable contenders. In a victory for a standardized web, Cascading Style Sheets, proposed by Håkon Wium Lie, were accepted over Netscape's JavaScript Style Sheets (JSSS) by W3C.

== Late 1990s ==
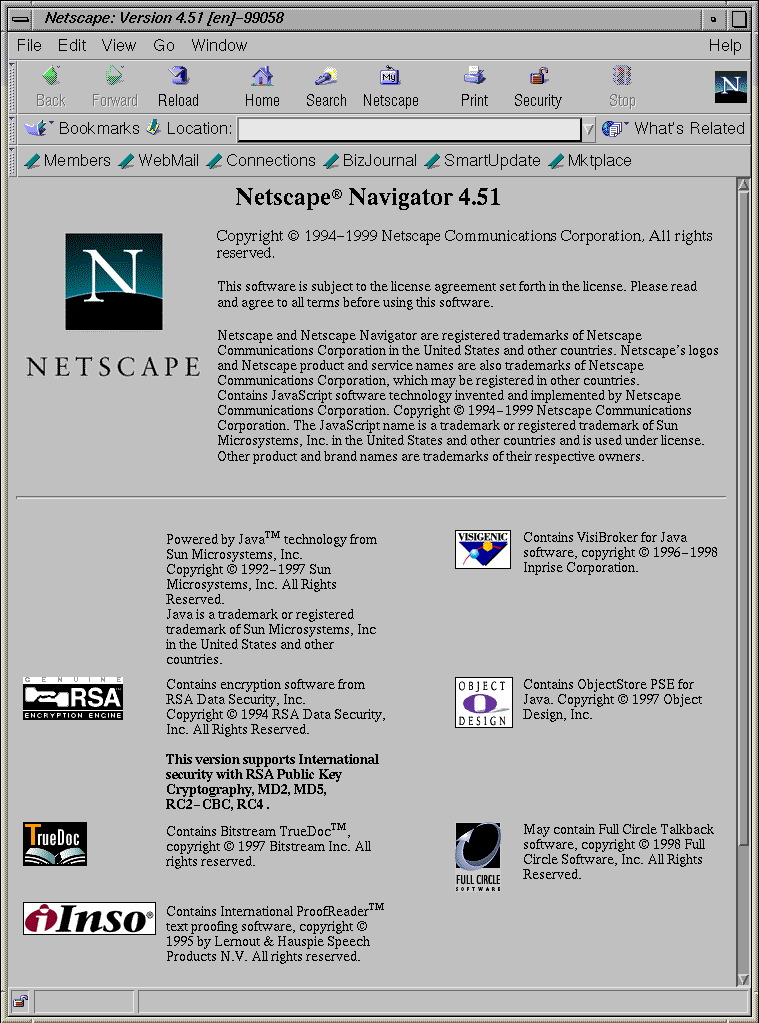
Netscape Navigator 4.51

=== Microsoft vs Netscape ===
In 1996, Netscape's share of the browser market reached 86% (with Internet Explorer approaching 10%); but then Microsoft began integrating its browser with its operating system and bundling deals with OEMs. Within 4 years of its release IE had 75% of the browser market and by 1999 it had 99% of the market. Although Microsoft has since faced antitrust litigation on these charges, the browser wars effectively ended once it was clear that Netscape's declining market share trend was irreversible. Prior to the release of Mac OS X, Internet Explorer for Mac and Netscape were also the primary browsers in use on the Macintosh platform.

Unable to continue commercially funding their product's development, Netscape responded by open sourcing its product, creating Mozilla. This helped the browser maintain its technical edge over Internet Explorer, but did not slow Netscape's declining market share. Netscape was purchased by America Online in late 1998.

=== Permutations of web browsers ===
In 1998, an electronic literature experiment, The Impermanence Agent began as a storytelling Web agent that customized its texts and images based on monitoring of each reader's Web browsing. Noah Wardrip-Fruin, Adam Chapman, Brion Moss, Duane Whitehurst developed this agent with an original story, which became obscured with overlaid information as users browsed the web. The project lasted from 1998 to 2002. Alex Greenberger contends that this was one of the first works that showed how a digital feed could respond to individual users and use that data to "create unique experiences."

== 2000s ==
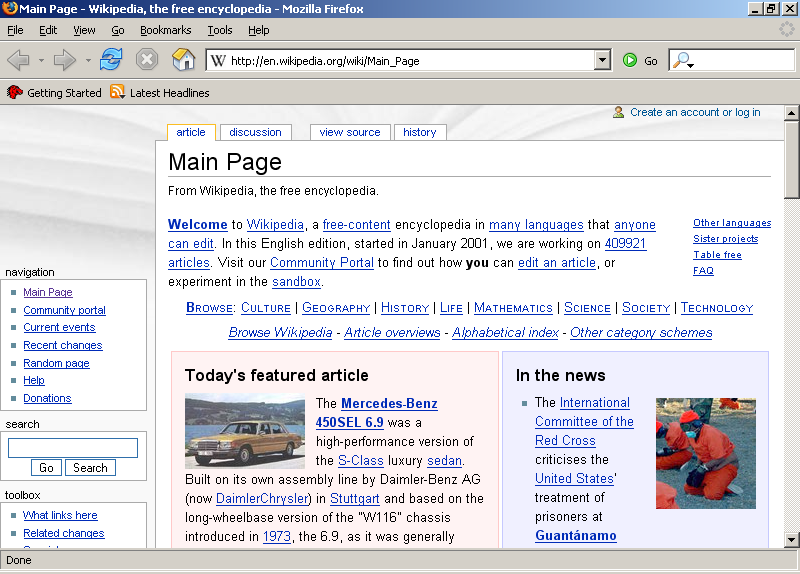
Mozilla Firefox 1.0

At first, the Mozilla project struggled to attract developers, but by 2002, it had evolved into a relatively stable and powerful internet suite. Mozilla 1.0 was released to mark this milestone. Also in 2002, a spinoff project that would eventually become the popular Firefox was released.

Firefox was always downloadable for free from the start, as was its predecessor, the Mozilla browser. Firefox's business model, unlike the business model of 1990s Netscape, primarily consists of doing deals with search engines such as Google to direct users towards them – see Web browser#Business models.

In 2003, Microsoft announced that Internet Explorer would no longer be made available as a separate product but would be part of the evolution of its Windows platform, and that no more releases for the Macintosh would be made.

AOL announced that it would retire support and development of the Netscape web browser in February 2008.

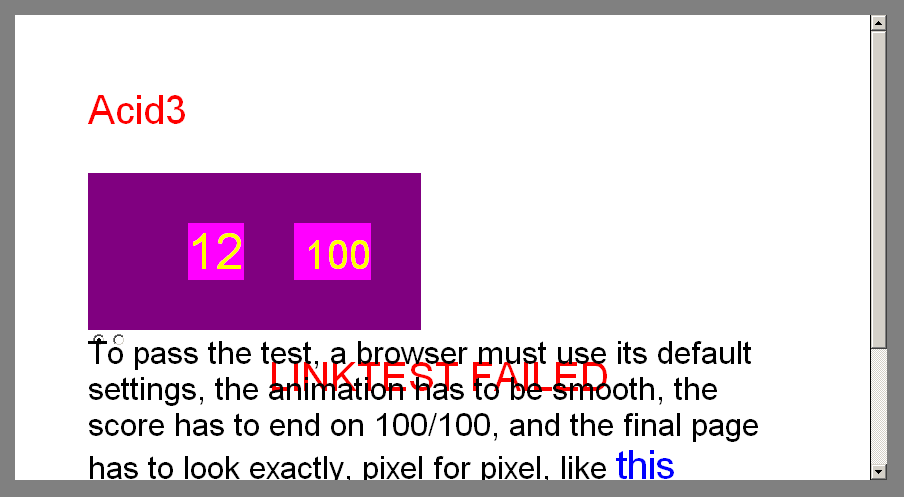
Internet Explorer 6's rendering of the Acid3 web standards test highlights idiosyncrasies in its rendering engine.

In the second half of 2004, Internet Explorer reached a peak market share of more than 92%. Since then, its market share has been slowly but steadily declining and is around 11.8% as of July 2013. In early 2005, Microsoft reversed its decision to release Internet Explorer as part of Windows, announcing that a standalone version of Internet Explorer was under development. Internet Explorer 7 was released for Windows XP, Windows Server 2003, and Windows Vista in October 2006. Internet Explorer 8 was released on 19 March 2009, for Windows XP, Windows Server 2003, Windows Vista, Windows Server 2008, and Windows 7. Internet Explorer 9, 10 and 11 were later released, and version 11 is included in Windows 10, but Microsoft Edge became the default browser there.

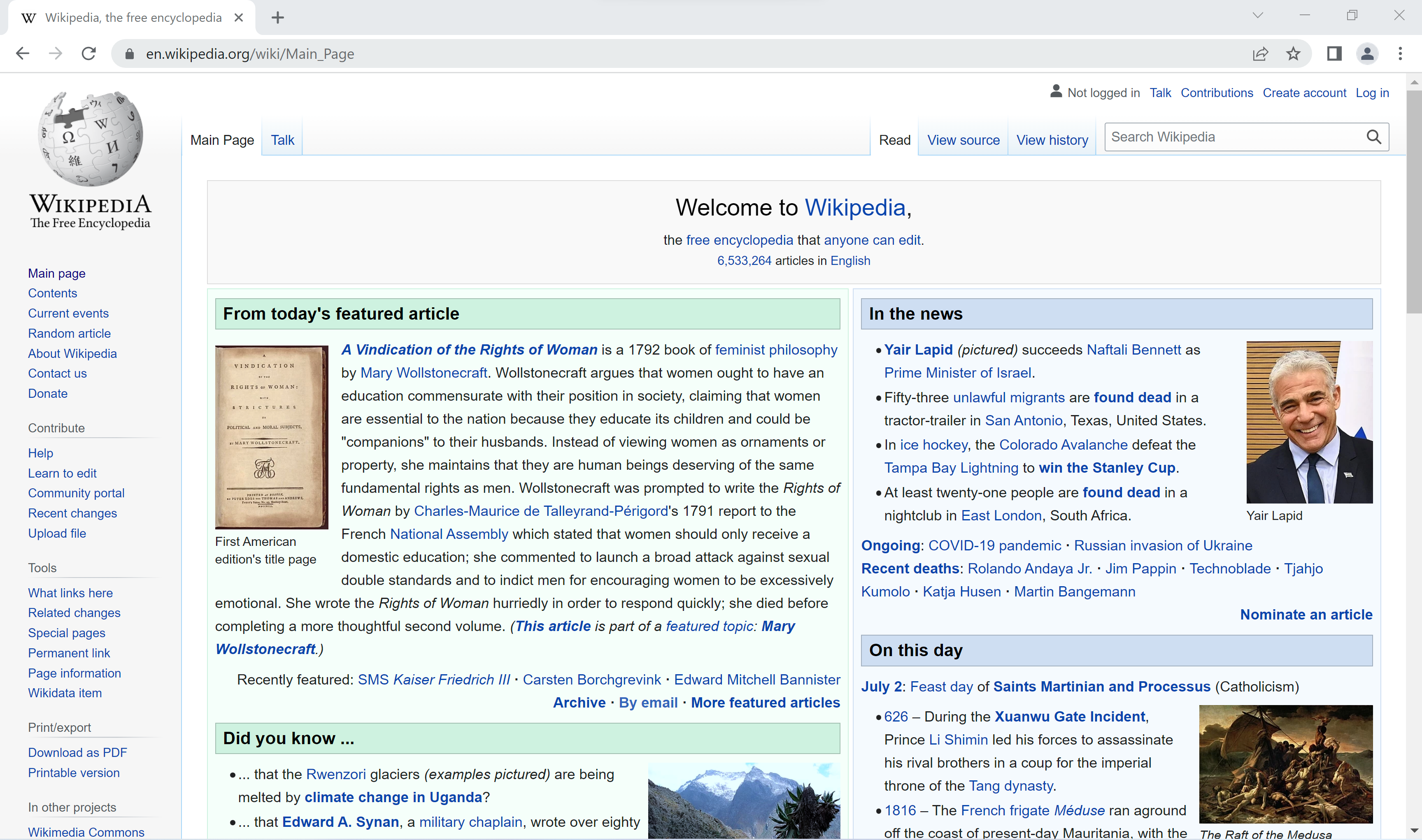
Google Chrome version 103 showing Wikipedia's main page

Apple's Safari, the default browser on Mac OS X from version 10.3 onwards, has grown to dominate browsing on Mac OS X. Browsers such as Firefox, Camino, Google Chrome, and OmniWeb are alternative browsers for Mac systems. OmniWeb and Google Chrome, like Safari, use the WebKit rendering engine (forked from KHTML), which is packaged by Apple as a framework for use by third-party applications. In August 2007, Apple also ported Safari for use on the Windows XP and Vista operating systems.

Opera was first released in 1996. It was a popular choice in handheld devices, particularly mobile phones, but remains a niche player in the PC Web browser market. It was also available on Nintendo's DS, DS Lite and Wii consoles. The Opera Mini browser uses the Presto layout engine like all versions of Opera, but runs on most phones supporting Java MIDlets.

The Lynx browser remains popular for Unix shell users and with vision impaired users due to its entirely text-based nature. There are also several text-mode browsers with advanced features, such as w3m, Links (which can operate both in text and graphical mode), and the Links forks such as ELinks.

== Relationships of browsers ==
A number of web browsers have been derived and branched from source code of earlier versions and products.

== Timeline of Web browsers ==
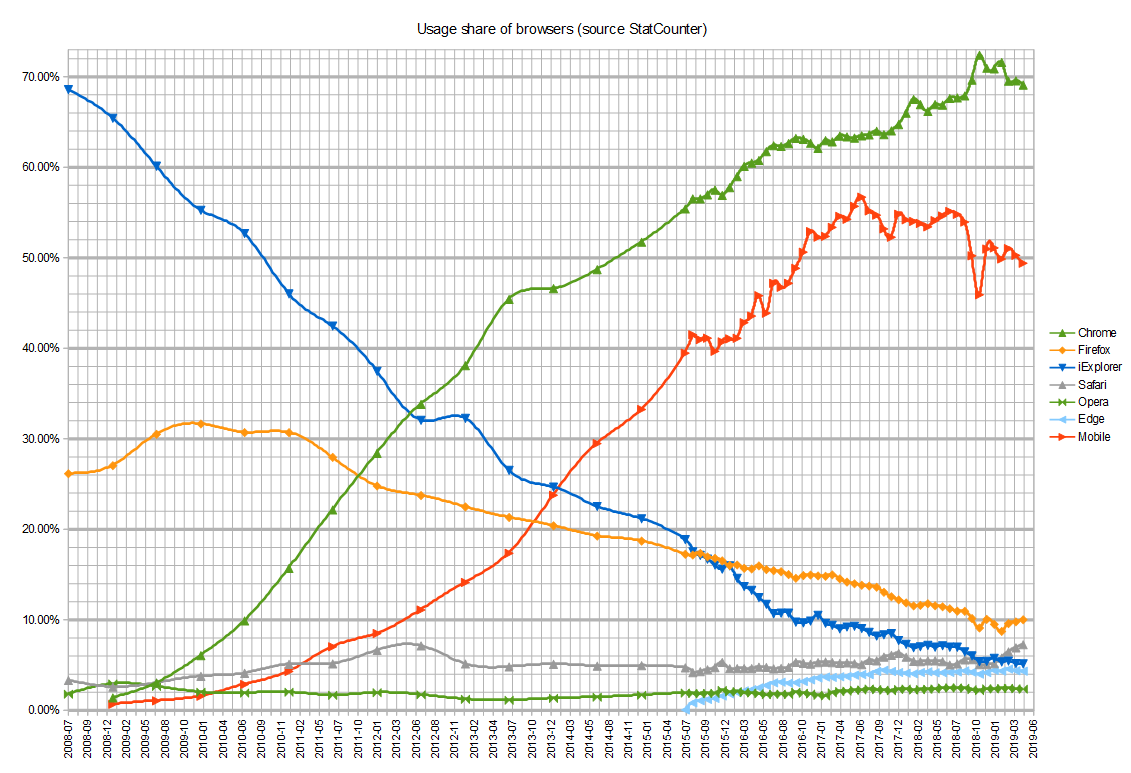
Usage share of web browsers according to StatCounter till 2019-05. See HTML5 beginnings, Presto rendering engine deprecation and Chrome's dominance.

This is a table of personal computer web browsers by year of release of major version. The increased growth of the Internet in the 1990s and 2000s means that current browsers with small market shares have more total users than the entire market early on. For example, 90% market share in 1997 would be roughly 60 million users, but by the start of 2007 9% market share would equate to over 90 million users.

Year	Web browsers
1990	WorldWideWeb (Nexus)
1991	Line Mode Browser
1992	Erwise, MacWWW (Samba), MidasWWW, ViolaWWW
1993	AMosaic 1.0, Arena, Cello, Lynx 2.0, Mosaic
1994	Agora (Argo), IBM WebExplorer, IBrowse, MacWeb, Minuet, Netscape Navigator, SlipKnot 1.0
1995	Grail, Internet Explorer 1, Internet Explorer 2, Netscape Navigator 2.0, OmniWeb, UdiWWW
1996	Amaya 0.9, Arachne 1.0, AWeb, Cyberdog, Internet Explorer 3.0, MSN Program Viewer 2.0, Netscape Navigator 3.0, Opera 2.0, PowerBrowser 1.5, Voyager
1997	Amaya 1.0, Internet Explorer 4.0, MSN Program Viewer 2.5, Netscape Navigator 4.0, Netscape Communicator 4.0, Opera 3.0
1998	iCab, Mozilla
1999	Amaya 2.0, Mozilla M3, Internet Explorer 5.0
2000	Amaya 3.0, Amaya 4.0, K-Meleon 0.2, Konqueror, Netscape 6, Opera 4, Opera 5
2001	Amaya 5.0, Internet Explorer 6, MSN Explorer 6.0, Galeon 1.0, Opera 6
2002	Amaya 6.0, Amaya 7.0,Phoenix 0.1, Netscape 7, Mozilla 1.0, Links 2.0
2003	Amaya 8.0, Epiphany 1.0, Opera 7, Apple Safari 1.0
2004	Firefox 1.0, Netscape Browser, OmniWeb 5.0
2005	Amaya 9.0, AOL Explorer 1.0, Epiphany 1.8, Maxthon 1.0, Netscape Browser 8.0, Opera 8, Apple Safari 2.0, Shiira 1.0
2006	Camino 1.0, Galeon 2.0, iCab 3, K-Meleon 1.0, Mozilla Firefox 2.0, Internet Explorer 7, Opera 9,, SeaMonkey 1.0
2007	Conkeror, Flock 1.0, Apple Safari 3.0, Netscape Navigator 9, NetSurf 1.0
2008	Google Chrome 1, Maxthon 2.0, Mozilla Firefox 3, Opera 9.5,, Apple Safari 3.1, Konqueror 4, Amaya 10.0, Flock 2, Amaya 11.0
2009	Google Chrome 2–3, Mozilla Firefox 3.5, Internet Explorer 8, Opera 10,, Apple Safari 4, SeaMonkey 2, Camino 2, surf, Pale Moon 3.0
2010	Google Chrome 4–8, Mozilla Firefox 3.6, Opera 10.50,, Opera 11, Apple Safari 5, K-Meleon 1.5.4, xxxterm
2011	Google Chrome 9–16, Mozilla Firefox 4–9, Internet Explorer 9, Opera 11.50, Apple Safari 5.1, Maxthon 3.0, SeaMonkey 2.1–2.6
2012	Google Chrome 17–23, Mozilla Firefox 10–17, Internet Explorer 10, Opera 12, Apple Safari 6, Maxthon 4.0, SeaMonkey 2.7–2.14
2013	Google Chrome 24–31, Mozilla Firefox 18–26, Internet Explorer 11, Opera 15–18, Pale Moon 15.4–24.2.2, Apple Safari 7, SeaMonkey 2.15–2.23
2014	Google Chrome 32–39, Mozilla Firefox 27–34, Opera 19–26, Pale Moon 24.3.0–25.1.0, Apple Safari 8, SeaMonkey 2.24–2.30
2015	Google Chrome 40–47, Microsoft Edge [Legacy], Mozilla Firefox 35–43, Opera 27–34, Pale Moon 25.2.0–25.8.1, Vivaldi
2016	Google Chrome 48–55, Mozilla Firefox 44–50, Microsoft Edge 14, Opera 35–42, Pale Moon 26.0.0–27.0.3, Apple Safari 9–10, SeaMonkey 2.24–2.30
2017	Google Chrome 56–60, Microsoft Edge 15, Mozilla Firefox 51–55.0.2, Opera 43–45, Opera Neon, Pale Moon 27.1.0–27.6.2, Safari 10–11
2018	Chrome 64–71, Firefox 58–64, Microsoft Edge 42–44, Opera 50–57, Pale Moon 27.7.0–28.2.2, Safari 11–12, Vivaldi 1.14–2.2
2019	Chrome 72–79, Firefox 65–71, Microsoft Edge, Opera 58–65, Pale Moon 28.3.0–28.8.0, Safari 12–13, SeaMonkey, Vivaldi 2.2–2.10, Yandex.browser
2020	Chrome 80–87, Firefox 72–84, Microsoft [New] Edge, Opera 66–73, Pale Moon 28.8.1–28.17.0, Safari 13–14, SeaMonkey, Vivaldi 2.10–3.5, Yandex.browser
2021	Chrome 88–96, Firefox 85–95, Microsoft Edge 88–96, Opera 74–82, Pale Moon 29.0.0–29.4.3, Safari 15, Vivaldi 3.6–5.0
2022	Chrome 97–107, Firefox 96–107, Microsoft Edge 97–107, Opera 83–93, Pale Moon 29.4.4-31.4.2, Safari 15.4–16.2, Vivaldi 5.1–5.6
2023	Chrome 108–120.0.6099.129, Firefox 108–121.0, Microsoft Edge 108–120.0.2210.61, Opera 94–106.0.4998.19, Pale Moon 31.4.3-32.5.2, Safari 16.3–17.2, Vivaldi 5.7–6.5, Arc 1.10-1.21.0
2024	Chrome 120–Current, Firefox 122–Current, Microsoft Edge 121–Current, Opera 106-Current, Pale Moon 33-Current, Safari 17.3–Current, Vivaldi 6.6-Current, Arc 1.21.1-Current, Ecosia Browser 1.0.0.31–Current

== Historical web browsers ==
This table focuses on operating system (OS) and browsers of the 1990 to 2000. The year listed for a version is usually the year of the first official release, with an end year being end of development, project change, or relevant termination. Releases of OS and browser from the early 1990s to before 2001–02 time frame are the current focus.

Many early browsers can be made to run on later OS (and later browsers on early OS in some cases); however, most of these situations are avoided in the table. Terms are defined below.

Browser	Years	MS 10/Server 2016/Server 2019/Server 2022/11/Server 2025	Windows 7/Server 2008 R2/8/Server 2012/Server 2012 R2	XP/Server 2003/Vista/Server 2008	2000	98/Me	NT 4.0	95	3.1	IBM OS/2	Mac OS X (Intel/Apple silicon)	Mac OS X (PPC)	Mac OS 9	Mac OS 8	System 7 (PPC/68k)	Linux	BSD	Unix (HP-UX, Solaris)	Other
Years (OS)	–	2015–current	2009–2013	2001–2008	2000	1998-2000	1996	1995	1992	1988	2005-current	2001-2007	1999	1997	1991	1994 (1.0)/1991	1993	(1990s)	–
AWeb	1996–2007	No	No	No	No	No	No	No	No	No	No	No	No	No	No	No	No	No	AmigaOS; MorphOS
Cello	1993–94	No	No	No	No	No	Terminated (1.01a)	No	Terminated (1.01a)	Terminated (1.01a)	No	No	No	No	No	No	No	No	No
DocZilla	2003–05	Terminated (1.0)	Terminated (1.0)	Terminated (1.0)	Terminated (1.0)	Terminated (1.0)	Terminated (1.0)	Terminated (1.0)	No	No	No	No	No	No	No	Terminated (1.0)	No	No	No
IBM WebExplorer	1994	No	No	No	No	No	No	No	Unknown	Terminated (1.1h)	No	No	No	No	No	No	No	No	No
ICab	1998–current	No	No	No	No	No	No	No	No	No	Yes	Dropped (5.1.1)	Dropped (3.0.5)	Dropped (3.0.5)	Dropped (2.9.9)	No	No	No	No
Internet Explorer	1995–2022	No	Included	Dropped (Windows XP and Server 2003, included 6.0, support dropped as of IE9, Vista and Server 2008, included 7.0, support dropped as of IE10)	Dropped (6.0 SP1) (included 5.0)	Dropped (6.0 SP1) (included 5.0)	Dropped (6.0 SP1) (included 2.0)	Dropped (5.5) (included 2.0 with Plus95)	Dropped (5.0)	No	No	No	No	No	Dropped (3.0)	Dropped* (5.01 SP1)	No	Dropped* (5.01 SP1)	No
IE Mac (IE5, Tasman)	1996–2003	No	No	No	No	No	No	No	No	No	No	Dropped (5.2.3)	Dropped (5.1.7)	Dropped (5.1.7)	No	No	No	No	No
Konqueror	1996–current	Yes	Yes	Yes	Dropped (4.8)	No	No	No	No	No	Yes	Dropped	No	No	No	Yes	Yes	Yes	No
Lunascape	2004–current	Yes	Yes	Yes	Dropped (6.1)	No	No	No	No	No	Yes	Dropped	No	No	No	No	No	No	No
MacWeb	1994–96	No	No	No	No	No	No	No	No	No	No	No	No	Unknown	Terminated (2.0)	No	No	No	No
Mosaic	1993–97	No	No	No	No	No	Terminated	Terminated	Terminated	Terminated	No	No	Terminated (3.0)	Terminated	Terminated	Dropped (2.6)	Dropped (2.6)	Dropped (2.6)	OpenVMS
Mozilla (restarted SeaMonkey)	2002–06	Terminated (1.7.13)	Terminated (1.7.13)	Terminated (1.7.13)	Terminated (1.7.13)	Terminated (1.7.13)	Terminated (1.7.13)	Terminated (1.7.13)	Dropped	Terminated (1.7.13)	Terminated (1.7.13)	Terminated (1.7.13)	Dropped (1.2.1)	Dropped (1.0.1)	No	Terminated (1.7.13)	Terminated (1.7.13)	Terminated (1.7.13)	OpenVMS
Mozilla Firefox	2004–current	Yes	Yes (115 ESR)	Dropped (52 ESR)	Dropped (12 and 10 ESR)	Dropped (2.0)	Dropped (2.0)	Dropped (1.5)	No	No	Yes	Dropped (3.6)	No	No	No	Yes	Yes	No	No
Netscape Navigator 9	2008	Terminated	Terminated	Terminated	Terminated	Terminated	No	No	No	No	Terminated	Terminated	No	No	No	Terminated (kernel 2.2.14)	No	No	No
Netscape Browser	2004–07	Terminated	Terminated	Terminated	Terminated	Terminated	Terminated	Terminated	No	No	No	No	No	No	No	No	No	No	No
Netscape 7 Netscape 6	2000–04	Terminated (7.2)	Terminated	Terminated (7.2)	Terminated (7.2)	Terminated (7.2)	Terminated (7.2)	Terminated (7.2)	No	No	Terminated (7.2)	Terminated (7.2)	Dropped (7.02)	Dropped (7.02)	Unknown	Terminated (7.2)	Terminated (7.2)	Terminated (7.2)	No
Netscape Communicator	1997–2002	Terminated (4.8)	Terminated	Terminated (4.8)	Terminated (4.8)	Terminated (4.8)	Terminated (4.8)	Terminated	Dropped (4.08)	Terminated	No	No	Terminated (4.8)	Terminated (4.8)	Dropped (4.08)	Dropped (4.77)	Terminated	Dropped (4.77)	No
Netscape Navigator	1994–98	No	No	No	No	Terminated (4.08)	Terminated	Terminated	Terminated (4.08)	Terminated	No	No	Terminated (4.08)	Dropped	Dropped 3.0.4	Terminated (4.08)	Terminated (4.08)	Terminated (4.08)	OpenVMS
OmniWeb	1995–current	No	No	No	No	No	No	No	No	No	Yes	Yes	Dropped (4.0)	Dropped	Dropped	No	No	No	NeXTSTEP
Opera	1996–current	Yes	Dropped (95)	Dropped (36)	Dropped (12.02)	Dropped (10.63)	Dropped (10.63)	Dropped (10.63)	Dropped (3.62)	Dropped (5.12)	Yes	Dropped (10.63)	Dropped (7.54u2)	Dropped (6.03)	Unknown	Yes	Dropped (12.16)	Yes (Note: Opera dropped support for Solaris in 10.10.)	Yes (Note: Cell phones, Nintendo DS / Wii, Symbian, Windows Mobile, iOS (Opera Mini – available from App Store); BeOS (dropped 3.62), QNX (dropped 6.01))
UdiWWW	1995–96	No	No	No	No	No	Terminated (1.2.000)	Terminated (1.2.000)	Terminated (1.2.000)	No	No	No	No	No	No	No	No	No	No
ViolaWWW	1992	No	No	No	No	No	No	No	No	No	No	No	No	No	No	No	No	Yes	X11
WorldWideWeb	1991	No	No	No	No	No	No	No	No	No	No	No	No	No	No	No	No	No	NeXTSTEP; OpenStep
Browser	Years	MS Windows 10 and later, Server 2016 and later	Windows 7/Server 2008 R2/8/Server 2012/Server 2012 R2	XP/Server 2003/Vista/Server 2008	2000	98/Me	NT 4.0	95	3.1x	IBM OS/2	Mac OS X (Intel/Apple silicon)	Mac OS X (PPC)	Mac OS 9	Mac OS 8	System 7 (PPC/68k)	Linux	BSD	Unix (HP-UX, Solaris)	Other

== See also ==
- Comparison of web browsers
- History of the Internet
- History of the World Wide Web
- List of web browsers
- Usage share of web browsers
