= IBox =

IBox (Internet in a Box) was one of the first commercially available Internet connection software packages available for sale to the public. O'Reilly & Associates (now O'Reilly Media) created and produced the package, in collaboration with Spry, Inc. Spry, Inc. also started up a commercial Internet service provider (ISP) called InterServ.

The IBox software included the Winsock program and TCP/IP stack that were needed to connect a computer running Microsoft Windows to the Internet in 1994. The IBox package also included a licensed copy of the NCSA Mosaic web browser called AIR Mosaic, AIR Mail (an email client), AIR News (an NNTP news client), AIR Telnet, AIR Gopher, and an FTP Network File Manager.

Combined with InterServ's dial-up access, Internet in a Box provided a complete solution for members of the general public to access the Internet, a network previously available almost exclusively to government and collegiate users, or to the public only indirectly through e-mail gateways provided by hosted systems such as BBSes and CompuServe. The inclusion of a web browser further gave access to the then-nascent World Wide Web.

The pioneering Internet book from O'Reilly, Ed Krol's 'Whole Internet User's Guide and Catalog' (US-1993) was included in the US product. The European edition of the product also included Sue Schofield's 'UK Internet Book' (UK 1994).

== Spry, Inc. ==
Spry, Inc. was a small software company headed up by David Pool in Seattle, Washington. Spry was the first company licensing the Mosaic Web browser source code. In 1995 CompuServe bought Spry, Inc. for $100 million in cash and stock of H&R Block (the parent company of CompuServe).
