= Holy Grail (disambiguation) =

The Holy Grail is a mystical object in the Arthurian legend.

Holy Grail is commonly used in a phrase to analogously denote something with high perceived value:

- A rare, valuable object, source, event or difficult-to-reach goal in a given field:
  - Twin Sisters, the "Texas Holy Grail"
  - A rare acetate by the Beatles, with the songs "Hello Little Girl" and "Till There Was You"
- A major, important unsolved problem in a given field; see Lists of unsolved problems
  - (For example, the Riemann hypothesis might be called "a holy grail" of mathematics, as could a theory of everything for physics, or P vs. NP for computational complexity theory)

Holy Grail may also refer to:

== Arts and entertainment ==
=== Music ===
- Holy Grail (band), a heavy metal band from Pasadena, California
- Holy Grail (album), a 2011 album by Versailles
- "Holy Grail" (Hunters & Collectors song), 1992
- "Holy Grail" (Jay-Z song), 2013, featuring Justin Timberlake

=== Other ===
- Holy Grail tapestries, six tapestries woven by Morris & Co. in the 1890s
- Holy Grail (Centuria), fictional member of the Iris Stratum in the Japanese web manga Centuria
- Monty Python and the Holy Grail, a 1975 comedy film

== Sport ==
- Stanley Cup, sometimes referred to as the "Holy Grail"
- AFL Premiership, sometimes referred to as the "Holy Grail"

== Other ==
- Holy Grail Temple, a mountain in the Grand Canyon
- Holy Grail (web design), a CSS programming trick for dividing a web page into three columns

== See also ==
- Grail (disambiguation)
- Grail Quest (disambiguation)
- "The Unholy Grail", a 1962 sword and sorcery novella by Fritz Leiber
