= Slipknot (disambiguation) =

A slip knot is a releasable stopper knot.

Slipknot may also refer to:

== Music ==
- Slipknot (band), an American heavy metal band
  - Slipknot (album)
  - "Slipknot", a song on their demo Mate. Feed. Kill. Repeat.
- "Slipknot!", a song by the Grateful Dead from Blues for Allah
- "Slip Knot (Hang Knot)", a 1944 song by Woody Guthrie
- "Slipknot", a song by XXXTentacion from Revenge and Members Only, Vol 3

== Other uses ==
- Slipknot (comics), a supervillain from DC Comics
- SlipKnot (web browser), an early web browser

== See also ==
- Slipped knot, a knot finished with a bight rather than a free end
