= Grail (disambiguation) =

The Grail or Holy Grail is a mythical object of Arthurian legend.

Grail may also refer to:

== Entertainment ==
- "Grail" (Babylon 5), a 1994 episode of the Babylon 5 television series
- Grail (DC Comics), a fictional character in the DC Universe who is the daughter of Darkseid and an enemy of Wonder Woman
- The Grail (comics), the secret society from the comic book Preacher
- Grail (Salvador Joel Alonday), a member of WildStorm's team Wetworks (comics)
- The Grail, a 1988 adventure video game by Microdeal
- The Grail, a 1915 short film directed by William Worthington
- The Grail, an internal nickname within Riot Games for the Untitled Runeterra MMO

== Science and technology ==
- Grail (web browser), a free extensible web browser written in Python
- GRAIL or Gravity Recovery and Interior Laboratory, a 2011 twin-spacecraft NASA Moon mission
- GRAIL (protein), a human enzyme also known as RNF128
- Graphic Input Language, used in the RAND Tablet
- GRAIL (company), a biotechnology and pharmaceutical company

== Other uses ==
- SA-7 Grail, NATO reporting name of the Strela 2 Russian surface-to-air missile system
- Grail (women's movement), a quasi-religious women's group
- Grail Movement, a religious movement inspired by the work of Oskar Ernst Bernhardt
- Bernard Grail (born 1946), French general, commandant of the French Foreign Legion
- Grail Psalms, an English translation of the Book of Psalms
- Grail, an English term for the Gradual, a chant in the Mass.

== See also ==
- Holy Grail (disambiguation)
- Grails (disambiguation)
