= Grails =

Grails may refer to:

- Grails (band) is an American instrumental rock band
- Grails (framework) is an open source web application framework

== See also ==
- Grail (disambiguation)
