= AirMosaic =

- A screenshot displaying an early web crawler search engine
- Developer: SPRY
- Release: 1994; 32 years ago
- Operating system: Microsoft Windows
- Available in: English
- Type: web browser
- License: Proprietary/Commercial

AirMosaic was an early commercial web browser based on the NCSA Mosaic browser.

The browser won Datamation's Best Product of the Year award for 1994.

The AirMosaic browser was available as part of several packages: the AIR Series, Internet in a Box and Mosaic In A Box, and separately. AirMosaic for Windows could also be downloaded as a demo, and then purchased over the Internet as a separate product. Also CompuServe WinCim 2.0.1 included a Version of "CompuServe Mosaic", a rebranded version with some WinCim integration.

== Features ==
Although Mosaic required the user to install Win32s, AirMosaic offered the same feature set as Mosaic as well as several new ones like a configuration menu for not editing an INI file.

Other features included:

- a kiosk mode
- import existing bookmarks from Mosaic
