= IBM WebExplorer =

Discontinued web browser for IBM OS/2

- IBM WebExplorer displaying the White House website.
- Developer: IBM
- Initial release: November 27, 1995; 30 years ago
- Final release: 1.2 / November 25, 1998; 27 years ago
- Operating system: OS/2
- Available in: English
- Type: Web browser
- Website: networking.ibm.com at the Wayback Machine (archived January 16, 1999)

IBM WebExplorer was an early web browser designed at IBM facilities in the Research Triangle Park for OS/2.

== History ==
Presented in 1994 with OS/2 Warp (v3), it was hailed as the best browser by Internet Magazine in their November issue and leveraged its position as the only native browser in OS/2 at that time. It was a "coming attraction" in The HTML Sourcebook: The Complete Guide to HTML. Almost immediately after the introduction of OS/2 Warp version 3, IBM dismantled the development team and that relegated the WebExplorer to the annals of history. OS/2 Warp 4 (1996) included it, but also included a link to download an OS/2 version of Netscape Navigator 2.02, which was late for shipping on CD. IBM had already planned the substitution of WebExplorer.

In 1995, it was added to AIX, IBM's proprietary UNIX platform.

A 1996 review in PC Mag found that WebExplorer "lack[ed] several standard features" and wasn't very strong in terms of multimedia support. The IBM browser shipping with the IBM Internet Connection suite, WebExplorer Mosaic, was based on the Spyglass Mosaic code base and was found by the reviewer to be "far superior" to the OS/2 version, which was developed solely by IBM.

== Features ==
- Support for HTML 3.0 (with tables)
- Usenet reader
- Some of its parts could be reused in other programs and scripted with Rexx. Some external companies used this capability to offer an enhanced browser with IBM's rendering engine
- A page could define what the animated throbber should look like. It was implemented through a non-standard <frame> HTML tag. OS/2 users created several animations. The later introduction of web frames leads WebExplorer to confusion on modern pages
- A presentation mode without visible menu bars
- A menu option Links collecting all the links in the page. It was used by IBM VoiceType for voice navigation
- Java applets
- GIF support
- Proxy authentication
- Image map
- Webmap "hierarchically displays your complete path through the web; a pointer denotes the current site, but any site can be revisited with only a mouse click."

== Version history ==
Version	Date	New features	Systems
1.0	January 6, 1995	Customized Animations	OS/2 2.1, OS/2 Warp
1.01	April 5, 1995		OS/2 2.1, OS/2 Warp
1.02	June 28, 1995	Drag and Drop Support Color Palette Management	OS/2 Warp
1.03	September 28, 1995	Newsgroup Manager HTML Extensions	OS/2 Warp
1.1a	March 22, 1996		OS/2 Warp
1.1b	1996		OS/2 Warp
1.1c	June 6, 1996		OS/2 Warp
1.1d	June 14, 1996		OS/2 Warp
1.1e	July 11, 1996		OS/2 Warp
1.1f	September 13, 1996	Option "No Proxy For"	OS/2 Warp
1.1g	November 7, 1996		OS/2 Warp
1.1h	December 11, 1996		OS/2 Warp
1.2	1996		OS/2 Warp Version 4

There were several builds released by IBM. IBM released some beta builds and also fixed many bugs in WebExplorer, one beta including support for Java.

== Criticism ==
The browser did not support Frames and the installation of plugins like Java was complicated.
