= Ed Krol =

American network engineer (born 1951)

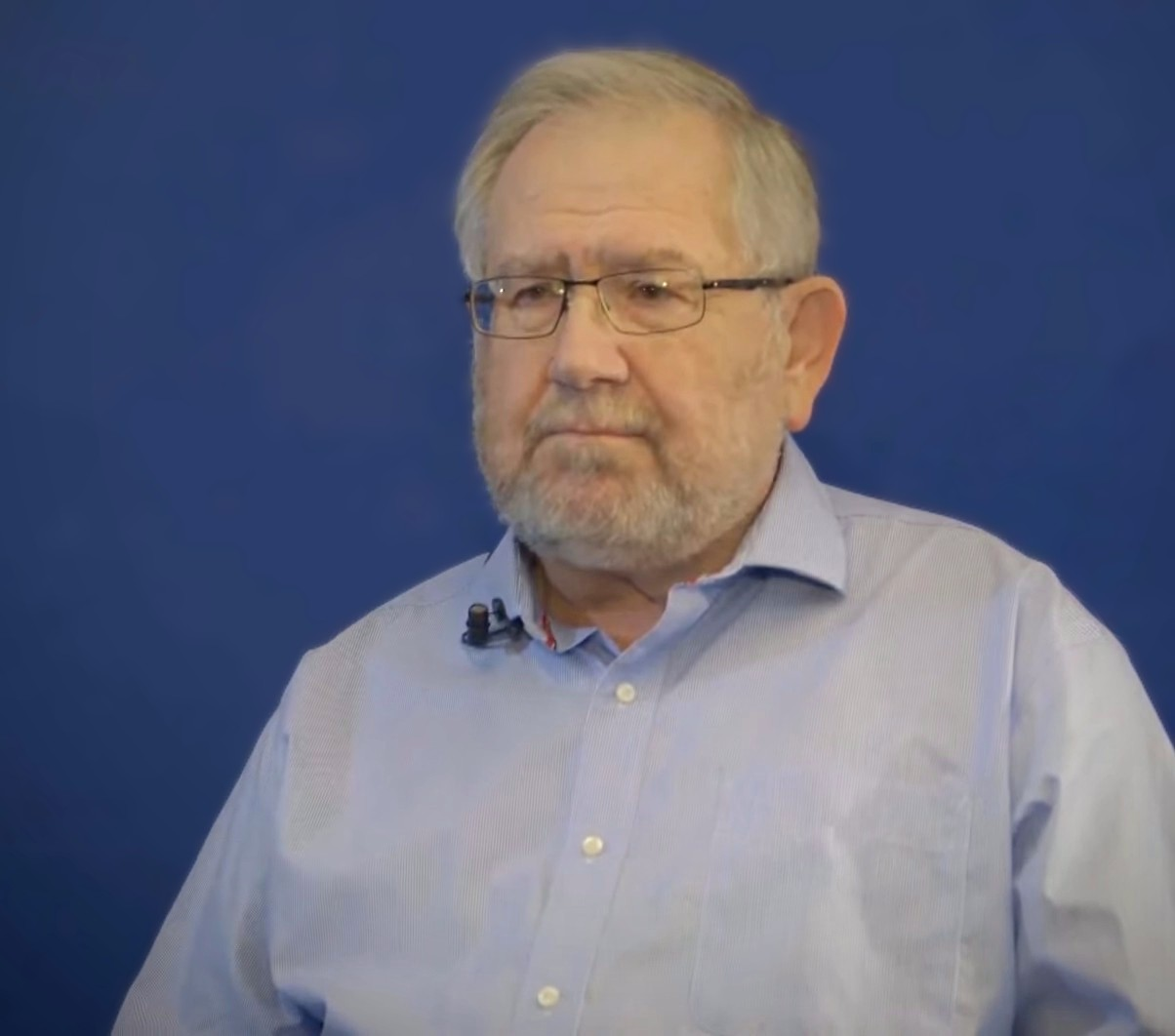
- Born: August 21, 1951 (age 75); USA
- Education: University of Illinois
- Writing career
- Genre: Technology
- Subject: The Internet
- Notable works: Hitchhiker's Guide to the Internet; Whole Internet User's Guide and Catalog

Ed Krol (born August 21, 1951) is the former network manager at the National Center for Supercomputing Applications and the former assistant director of Campus Information Technologies and Educational Services (CITES) at the University of Illinois at Urbana–Champaign. He is also the author of The Hitchhiker's Guide to the Internet and The Whole Internet (User's Guide and Catalog).

== Background ==
Krol was born on August 21, 1951, and grew up in Chicago, Illinois. He received his B.A. from the University of Illinois and spent his entire career there.

== Career ==
In 1985, Krol began working at the National Center for Supercomputing Applications (NCSA). He was the network manager for the NCSA when the contract was received to establish the NSFNet, and led the team in the network development. He helped develop the Frequently Asked Questions format when he published the popular user's guide Hitchhiker's Guide to the Internet in 1987, which was funded by the National Science Foundation. In 1989, he became the assistant director for Network Information Services, Computing, and Communications Service Office at the University of Illinois.

In 1992, Krol published The Whole Internet User's Guide and Catalog, which was noted by the New York Public Library as one of its Books of the Century in 1995. The book was translated into over ten languages and sold over a million copies. This aided the worldwide acceptance and spread of the Internet. In 1999, Krol and Kiersten Conner-Sax published a sequel titled The Whole Internet User's Guide: The Next Generation.

In 2002 Krol retired from the University of Illinois after working there for 29 years.

== In popular culture ==
Krol's daughter, Molly Krol, is the namesake of the molly-guard, a slang term for a shield placed around an emergency stop that prevents it from being inadvertently pressed.

== Works ==
- Conner-Sax, Kiersten; Krol, Ed (15 November 1999). The Whole Internet: The Next Generation (3 ed.). O'Reilly Media. pp. 556. ISBN 978-1565924284.
- Ferguson, Paula; Krol, Ed (8 November 1995). The Whole Internet for Windows 95 (1 ed.). O'Reilly Media. pp. 644. ISBN 978-1565921559.
- Krol, Ed; Hoffman, Ellen (May 1993). FYI on "What is the Internet?". IETF. doi:10.17487/RFC1462. RFC 1462.
- Krol, Ed (1992). Whole Internet User's Guide and Catalog (1 ed.). O'Reilly Media. ISBN 9781565920255.
- Krol, Ed (September 1989). Hitchhiker's Guide to the Internet. IETF. doi:10.17487/RFC1118. RFC 1118.
- Krol, Ed (1987). Hitchhiker's Guide to the Internet.

== Awards ==
- Inducted into the Internet Hall of Fame 2017

== See also ==
- History of the Internet
