= Grail Quest (disambiguation) =

Grail Quest is the quest for the Holy Grail.

Grail Quest can also refer to:

- Grailquest, a series of gamebooks by J. H. Brennan
- Grail Quest (The Fantasy Trip), a 1980 role-playing game adventure using the rules of The Fantasy Trip
- The Grail Quest, a series of books written by the historical novelist Bernard Cornwell
