= UdiWWW =

Browser

UdiWWW HTML3 Web Browser
- A screenshot of UdiWWW showing its rendering capabilities
- Original author: Bernd Richter
- Release: 1995; 31 years ago
- Final release: 1.2.000 / April 9, 1996; 30 years ago
- Written in: C/C++
- Operating system: Windows 3.1 / 3.11 / NT / 95
- Size: 1.7 MB (32-bit); 570 KB (16-bit)
- Available in: English, German
- Type: Web browser
- License: Public domain
- Website: www.uni-ulm.de/~richter/udiwww/index.htm at the Wayback Machine (archived July 24, 1997)

UdiWWW is an early, now discontinued freeware graphical HTML 3.2 web browser for 16-bit and 32-bit Microsoft Windows. It was written and developed by Bernd Richter in C/C++ from 1995 to 1996. Following the release of version 1.2 in April 1996, Richter ceased development, stating "let Microsoft with the ActiveX Development Kit do the rest."

UdiWWW was among the first web browsers to support the then proposed HTML 3.0 standard. In doing so, it was also among the first browsers to support the specifications html math, html figures, and the PNG image format, which other leading browsers at the time such as Netscape and Internet Explorer 2.0 did not. The browser gained some popularity during 1996, but after development was abandoned, the browser fell out of favor.

The browser is no longer available from its original homepage. However, it (and its source) can still be downloaded from mirror sites.

== History ==
UdiWWW was created for the UDINE Projekt (Universal Document Information and Navigation Environment). UDINE was started in 1992 and the goal was to "create a flexible, multimedia information system that is able to show different files (text, picture, audio, and video) with a similar user interface on different systems." To be able to read "web information" the UDINE project was expanded by a web browser. It was not able to integrate common browsers like the NCSA Mosaic because of the client-server architecture without modification. The source code of Mosaic was not available at that time, so the university started their own project. UDINE-WWW-Viewer was created and had most features of HTML 3 integrated.

== Features ==
UdiWWW has the following features as of Version 1.2:

- HTML 3 support
- HTTP 1.0/FTP/Gopher/proxy support
- Plain text support
- Mailto support
- Graphics supported: GIF89a, X Window-XBM, Progressive JPEG, JPEG, and PNG
- Bookmarks
- Browsing and document history
- Page text search
- Page magnification
- Table support
- Icon entity support
- Link support
- Figures support
- Math support
- Print/Print Preview
- Save web page as .txt, .htm, or .udi
- Stop, refresh, reopen, or go back
- Open .html, .htm, and .ht3 files
- Caching of documents and images
- View page source
- View header response in "Document Information"
- Modify header sent in "HTTP Interactive"
- Netscape extension support
- Anchor highlighting

It also features a clock in the lower right hand corner that tells how long the browser has been up.

There is no official help file; rather, in the included .hlp file, Bernd Richter stated, "This help file was automatically created by the developing environment and is quite useless. As you know, UdiWWW is a 'One Man Show' and the author could not find time for writing help files."

== Criticism ==
UdiWWW was criticized for lacking many advanced features like news, FTP, HTML4, Dynamic HTML, support for targeted windows, a "new window" command for launching multiple sessions, client side image mapping, and security. It was also seen to be slow.
