= Oracle PowerBrowser =

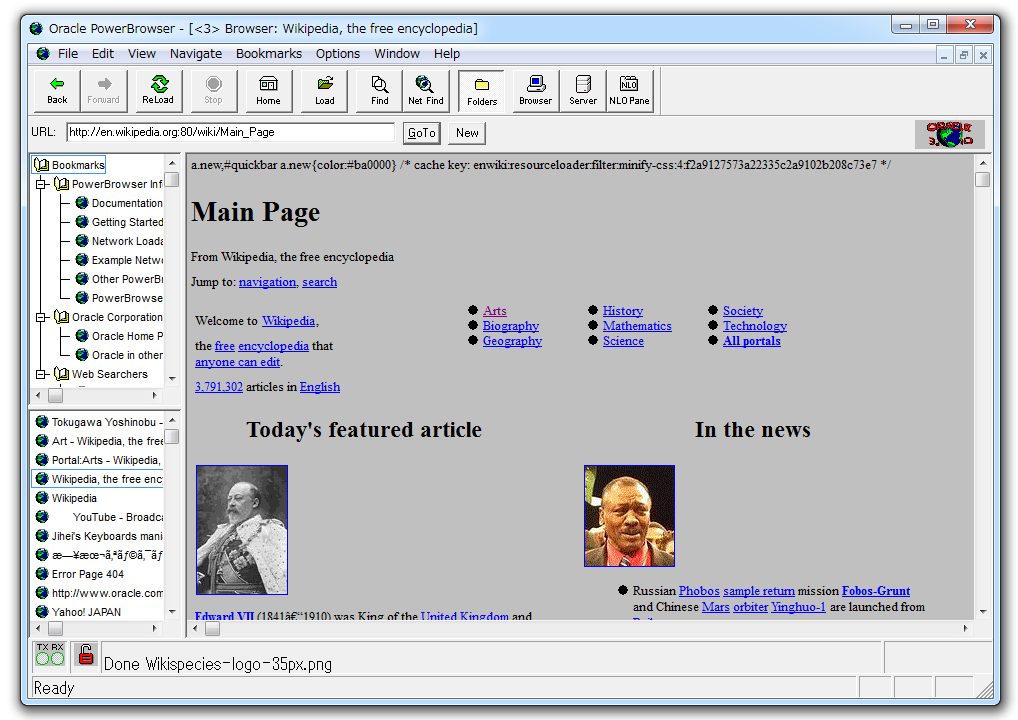
A screenshot of Oracle PowerBrowser

Oracle PowerBrowser was a web browser created by Oracle Corporation in 1996. It was discontinued mainly because of speed issues.

== Features ==
Features of Oracle PowerBrowser included:

- Support for Java and Basic scripting
- Support for Java applets
- A drag-and-drop web server called "Personal Server"
- A Database Wizard that helps users make Web applications using a database
- Support for Network Loadable Objects that extend browser functionality
- Support for SSL 2.0 and 3.0

== See also ==
- List of web browsers
