= MacWeb =

- MacWeb software icon
- Developer: TradeWave
- Initial release: May 31, 1994; 31 years ago
- Stable release: 2.0 / 1996; 30 years ago
- Operating system: Classic Mac OS
- Type: Web Browser
- License: Freeware
- Website: N/A

MacWeb is an early, now discontinued classic Mac OS-only web browser for 68k and PowerPC Apple Macintosh computers, developed by TradeWave (formerly EINet) between 1994 and 1996.

MacWeb's major attraction was its ability to run well on low-end hardware footprints as well as fast page display. This compactness led to MacWeb's inclusion on many "Internet starter kit" floppy disks and CD-ROMs that were popular at the time. TradeWave also developed a similar Microsoft Windows browser named WinWeb. However, they were eclipsed by more full-featured competitors such as Netscape Navigator, and development was eventually abandoned.

== Versions ==
The first public release was 0.98-alpha on May 31, 1994, and the final official release was version 2.0 in 1996. An unofficial patch "2.0c" was released by Antoine Hébert in 1998 to correct a problem on old machines not supporting color QuickDraw.

Although one author in 1995 called MacWeb the second web browser released for the Macintosh, this is not quite true. The text-only MacWWW browser became available in 1992, with the graphical Mosaic released for the Mac the next year.

== Features ==
MacWeb was a basic browser that contained features common to most browsers such as:

- support for HTML forms
- bookmarks with import tool for Mosaic's bookmarks
- a HTML viewer

MacWeb pioneered the "click and hold" gesture to display a popup contextual menu. This mouse gesture was commonly used on the Macintosh before the prevalence of two-button mice on the Mac platform. MacWeb's preferences dialog allowed users to customize display styles on a per-tag basis similar to Cascading style sheets

== System requirements ==
MacWeb has the following system requirements:

- Operating system: Classic Mac OS 7.0
- RAM: less than 700 KB RAM
- HDD: 680 KB
