= Erwise =

Discontinued graphical web browser

- Screenshot of the browser
- Developers: Kim Nyberg, Teemu Rantanen, Kati Suominen, Kari Sydänmaanlakka
- Release: 0.1 / 15 April 1992; 34 years ago
- Final release: 0.1 / 25 April 1994; 32 years ago
- Written in: C
- Platform: Unix (Sun-4, NeXT/CubX, DEC Ultrix) using Motif
- Available in: English
- Type: Web browser
- License: Public Domain
- Website: www.w3.org/History/19921103-hypertext/hypertext/Erwise/Review.html
- Repository: none

Erwise is an early discontinued web browser, and the first that was available for the X Window System.

Released in April 1992, the browser was written for Unix computers running X and used the W3 common access library. Erwise was the combined master's project of four Finnish students at the Helsinki University of Technology (now merged into Aalto University): Kim Nyberg, Teemu Rantanen, Kati Suominen and Kari Sydänmaanlakka. The group decided to make a web browser at the suggestion of Robert Cailliau, who was visiting the university, and were supervised by Ari Lemmke.

The development of Erwise halted after the students graduated and went on to other projects. Tim Berners-Lee, the creator of the World Wide Web, travelled to Finland to encourage the group to continue with the project. However, none of the project members could afford to continue with the project without proper funding.

The name Erwise originates from otherwise and the name of the project group, OHT.

== Development ==
For the web to be popularized, Tim Berners-Lee knew that what people wanted was a GUI-based browser – one that could target multiple operating systems, and most importantly, be easy to use for the technologically challenged. At the time, personal computers were also confusing to some people that were not experienced with technology.

== History ==
In the early 1990s, the Internet was still largely confined to academics and technicians, navigated via arcane command‑line tools or very rudimentary clients, which kept the Web out of reach for most users.

The four Helsinki students behind Erwise - Kim Nyberg, Teemu Rantanen, Kati Suominen and Kari Sydänmaanlakka - set out to break down these barriers by embedding hypertext in a graphical, point‑and‑click interface. Their vision was to simplify access and offer a visually engaging browsing experience for non‑experts.

- Extremely pre-documented (in Finnish).
- Serious coding started around March 1992.
- Alpha release available by anonymous FTP from info.cern.ch—binaries only (sun4 works, decstation too, display requires Motif) as of 15 April 1992.
- The source code released on the www-talk mailing list in August 1992.

== Characteristics ==
The following are significant characteristics of the browser:

- It used a multi-font text.
- The links of Erwise browser were underlined. To visit the links you had to double click on the links.
- Erwise could execute multiple window operation, though the optional single window mode was also available.
- Erwise could open local files.
- Erwise had little English documentation.
- Some of the buttons were for features that were not implemented.
- Tim Berners-Lee would have continued with the works of Erwise. He could not do so because Erwise's code was documented in the Finnish language.

== Criticism ==
Erwise crashed on some versions of Unix, which Berners-Lee attributed to poor Motif implementations.

== See also ==
- ViolaWWW

== Sources ==
- Berners-Lee, Tim: Weaving the Web ISBN 0-694-52125-6.
