= Whole Internet User's Guide and Catalog =

1992 book by Ed Krol

- Author: Ed Krol
- Language: English
- Genre: Computer Science
- Publisher: O'Reilly
- Publication date: September 1992
- Publication place: United States

The Whole Internet User's Guide and Catalog, by Ed Krol, was published in September 1992 by O'Reilly. The Los Angeles Times notes that the Whole Internet User's Guide and Catalog was the "first popular book about the medium" and "was later selected by the New York Public Library as one of the most significant books of the 20th century." The title and format were inspired by Stewart Brand's Whole Earth Catalog.

== Contents ==
=== The World Wide Web ===
In the May 1993 edition, the World Wide Web was described in terms of Gopher protocol:

In Chapter 14, Hypertext Spanning the Internet:WWW, we'll discuss ...The World Wide Web. On the surface, the Web looks like a variation on GOPHER (p. 189).

In addition, Krol notes:

The World Wide Web or WWW, is the newest information service to arrive on the Internet. The Web is based on a technology called hypertext....Like GOPHER and WAIS, the Web is very much under development, perhaps even more so. So don't be surprised if it doesn't occasionally work the way you'd like. It's certainly worth playing with (p. 227).

=== The Web v. Gopher ===
Krol compares the Web and Gopher, stating:

The Web and Gopher: You may be asking yourself what is so great about this. After all, what we've done so far isn't all that different from what you can do with Gopher. The Web appears to have a subject-oriented flavor, which is an advantage, but at first glance, it doesn't seem fundamentally different. That's not really true though. While there are a lot of similarities, the Web and Gopher differ in several ways. First, the Web is based on hypertext documents, and is structured by links between pages of hypertext. (231).

He further notes:

The Gopher just isn't as flexible. Its presentation is based on individual resources and servers...the web eliminates the barrier between your data and "public data" ... Ten years ago, a few dozen boxes full of index cards was de rigueur for anyone writing a dissertation or an academic book. With the Web, a few hypertext documents make that all obsolete (232).

=== Browsers ===
While Krol notes that a number of web browser options exist, he highlights ViolaWWW stating that, "The one called Viola or 'ViolaWWW' is probably the most feature rich" (p. 227).

=== Hypertext editors ===
At the time of publication, HTML editors or "hypertext editors" were rare. Krol states:

Hypertext Editors: At this time, hypertext editors, which are needed to take full advantage of the Web, are scarce. The WorldWideWeb browser for the NeXT workstation incorporates a hypertext editor; the ViolaWWW browser will eventually add a hypertext editor. For the moment, if you don't have a NeXT, you're out of luck. If you poke around in the online help long enough, you'll find a description of HTML, the markup language. If you're really bold, you can create hypertext 'by hand.' But that's beyond the scope of this book. We expect that use of the Web will really explode once hypertext editors are available. For the moment, though, its hobbled by the lack of editors (p. 241).

== Printing history ==
From inside cover of the November 1994 edition, supplemented with that of the December 1992 edition:

- September 1992: First Edition.
- November 1992: Minor corrections.
- December 1992: Minor corrections
- February 1993: Minor corrections.
- May 1993: Minor corrections.
- July 1993: Minor corrections.
- November 1993: Minor corrections. Updated Resources Catalog.
- April 1994: Second Edition.
- November 1994: Minor corrections.

As the Internet and PC operating systems evolved, the book was updated and re-released as two newer editions:

- October 1995 - "The Whole Internet for Windows 95: User's Guide and Catalog" by Ed Krol and Paula Ferguson.
- October 1999 - "The Whole Internet: The Next Generation" by Kiersten Conner-Sax and Ed Krol.
