= Grail (web browser) =

Free extensible web browser

- Grail 0.6 running under Python 2.7 on Linux
- Original author: Guido van Rossum
- Developer: Corporation for National Research Initiatives (CNRI)
- Release: August 1995; 30 years ago
- Preview release: 0.6 / 1 April 1999; 27 years ago
- Written in: Python
- Type: Web browser
- License: Free software license
- Website: grail.sourceforge.net
- Repository: sourceforge.net/projects/grail/

Grail was a free extensible multi-platform web browser written in the Python programming language. The project was started in August 1995, with its first public release in November of that year. The last official release was version 0.6 in 1999.

One of the major distinguishing features of Grail was the ability to run client-side Python code, in much the same way as mainstream browsers run client-side JavaScript code.
