= MidasWWW =

1992 web browser

- Developer: Tony Johnson
- Initial release: November 16, 1992; 33 years ago
- Operating system: UNIX/VMS
- Available in: EN
- Type: Web browser
- License: Freeware with source code
- Website: http://hpux.cs.utah.edu:80/hppd/hpux/Networking/WWW/midaswww-2.1/ (defunct, archived 1997 at the Internet Archive)

MidasWWW is one of the earliest (now discontinued) web browsers, developed at the Stanford Linear Accelerator Center (SLAC). It ran under Unix and OpenVMS. The last release was version 2.2. The 16 Nov 1992 sources were made available in June 2015 at GitHub.
