= NCSA Mosaic =

Early web browser (1993–1997)

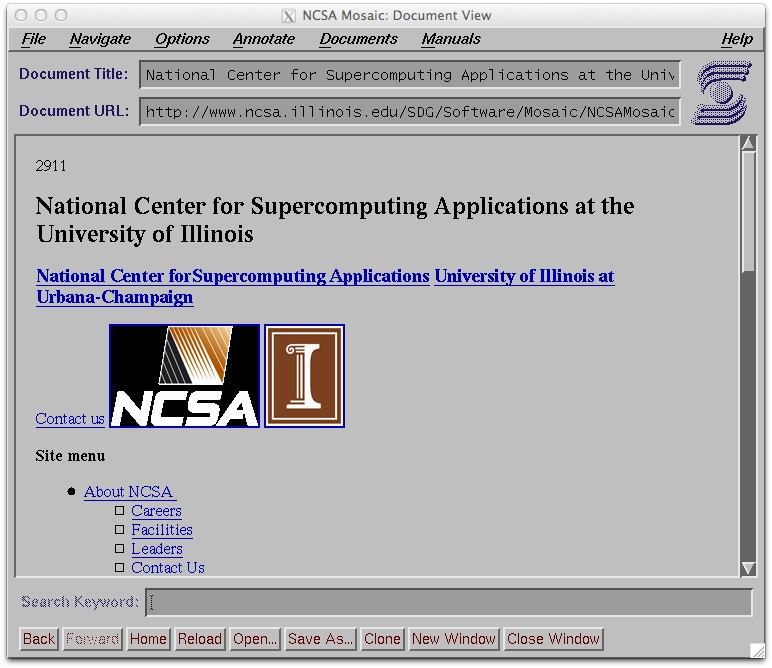
- NCSA Mosaic 1.2 for Unix
- Original authors: Marc Andreessen; Eric Bina
- Developer: NCSA
- Release: 0.5 / January 23, 1993; 33 years ago
- Final release: 3.0 / 7 January 1997; 29 years ago
- Written in: C
- Platform: AmigaOS; Classic Mac OS; Unix; OpenVMS; OS/2; Microsoft Windows
- Available in: English
- Type: Web browser
- License: Proprietary
- Website: ncsa.uiuc.edu at the Wayback Machine (archived 1998-02-23)
- Repository: github.com/alandipert/ncsa-mosaic

NCSA Mosaic, colloquially Mosaic, is a discontinued web browser that was instrumental in popularizing the World Wide Web and the general Internet during the 1990s. Although not the first web browser (preceded by WorldWideWeb, Erwise, and ViolaWWW), it was the first browser to display images inline with text instead of a separate window.

It supported various Internet protocols such as HTTP, FTP, NNTP, and Gopher. Its interface, reliability, personal computer support, and simple installation contributed to Mosaic's initial popularity.

Mosaic was developed at the National Center for Supercomputing Applications (NCSA) at the University of Illinois at Urbana–Champaign beginning in December 1992, released in January 1993, with official development and support until January 1997. Mosaic lost market share to Netscape Navigator in late 1994, and had only a tiny fraction of users left by 1997, when the project was discontinued. Microsoft licensed one of the derivative commercial products, Spyglass Mosaic, to create Internet Explorer in 1995.

== History ==
Mosaic 1.0 running under System 7.1, displaying the Mosaic Communications Corporation (later Netscape) website

In 1991, the High Performance Computing Act of 1991 was passed, which provided funding for new projects at the NCSA, where, after trying ViolaWWW, David Thompson demonstrated it to the NCSA software design group. This inspired Marc Andreessen and Eric Bina – two programmers working at NCSA – to create Mosaic. Andreessen and Bina began developing Mosaic in February 1991 for Unix's X Window System, calling it xmosaic. Marc Andreessen announced the project's first release, the "alpha/beta version 0.5," on January 23, 1993. Version 1.0 was released on April 21, 1993. Ports to Microsoft Windows and Macintosh were released in September. A port of Mosaic to the Amiga was available by October 1993. NCSA Mosaic for Unix (X Window System) version 2.0 was released on November 10, 1993 and was notable for adding support for forms, thus enabling the creation of the first dynamic web pages. From 1994 to 1997, the National Science Foundation supported the further development of Mosaic.

Marc Andreessen, the leader of the team that developed Mosaic, left NCSA and, with James H. Clark, one of the founders of Silicon Graphics, Inc. (SGI), and four other former students and staff of the University of Illinois, started Mosaic Communications Corporation. Mosaic Communications eventually became Netscape Communications Corporation, producing Netscape Navigator. Mosaic's popularity as a separate browser began to decrease after the 1994 release of Netscape Navigator, the relevance of which was noted in The HTML Sourcebook: The Complete Guide to HTML: "Netscape Communications has designed an all-new WWW browser, Netscape, that has significant enhancements over the original Mosaic program."

In 1994, SCO released Global Access, a modified version of SCO's Open Desktop Unix, which became the first commercial product to incorporate Mosaic. However, by 1998, the Mosaic user base had almost completely evaporated as users moved to other web browsers.

== Licensing ==
The licensing terms for NCSA Mosaic were generous for a proprietary software program. In general, non-commercial use was free of charge for all versions (with certain limitations). Additionally, the X Window System/Unix version publicly provided source code (source code for the other versions was available after agreements were signed). Despite persistent rumors to the contrary, however, Mosaic was never released as open source software during its brief reign as a major browser; there were always constraints on permissible uses without payment.

As of 1993, license holders included these:

- Amdahl Corporation
- Fujitsu Limited (Product: Infomosaic, a Japanese version of Mosaic. Price: Yen5,000 (approx US$50)
- Infoseek Corporation (Product: No commercial Mosaic. May use Mosaic as part of a commercial database effort)
- Quadralay Corporation (Consumer version of Mosaic. Also using Mosaic in its online help and information product, GWHIS. Price: US$249)
- Quarterdeck Office Systems Inc.
- The Santa Cruz Operation Inc. (Product: Incorporating Mosaic into "SCO Global Access", a communications package for Unix machines that works with SCO's Open Server. Runs a graphical e-mail service and accesses newsgroups.)
- SPRY Inc. (Products: A communication suite: Air Mail, Air News, Air Mosaic, etc. Also producing Internet In a Box with O'Reilly & Associates. Price: US$149–$399 for Air Series.)
- Spyglass, Inc. (Product: Spyglass Mosaic, essentially licensing the Mosaic name, as it was written from scratch, not using NCSA's Mosaic code. Relicensing to other vendors. Signed a deal with Digital Equipment Corp. to ship Mosaic with all its machines. Signed a deal with Microsoft to license Spyglass' code to develop Internet Explorer)

== Features ==
Robert Reid notes that Andreessen's team hoped:

... to rectify many of the shortcomings of the very primitive prototypes then floating around the Internet. Most significantly, their work transformed the appeal of the Web from niche uses in the technical area to mass-market appeal. In particular, these University of Illinois students made two key changes to the Web browser, which hyper-boosted its appeal: they added graphics to what was otherwise boring text-based software, and, most importantly, they ported the software from so-called Unix computers that are popular only in technical and academic circles, to the [Microsoft] Windows operating system, which is used on more than 80 percent of the computers in the world, especially personal and commercial computers.

Mosaic is based on the libwww library and thus supported a wide variety of Internet protocols included in the library: Archie, FTP, gopher, HTTP, NNTP, telnet, WAIS.

Mosaic is not the first web browser for Microsoft Windows; this is Thomas R. Bruce's little-known Cello. The Unix version of Mosaic was already famous before the Microsoft Windows, Amiga, and Mac versions were released. Other than displaying images embedded in the text (rather than in a separate window), Mosaic's original feature set is similar to the browsers on which it was modeled, such as ViolaWWW. But Mosaic was the first browser written and supported by a team of full-time programmers, was reliable and easy enough for novices to install, and the inline graphics proved immensely appealing. Mosaic is said to have made the Internet accessible to the ordinary person.

Mosaic was the first browser to explore the concept of collaborative annotation in 1993 but never passed the test state.

Mosaic was the first browser that could submit forms to a server.

== Impact ==
Mosaic led to the Internet boom of the 1990s. Other browsers existed during this period, such as Erwise, ViolaWWW, MidasWWW, and tkWWW, but did not have the same effect as Mosaic on public use of the Internet.

In the October 1, 1994 issue of the Wired magazine, Gary Wolfe notes in the article titled "The (Second Phase of the) Revolution Has Begun: Don't look now, but Prodigy, AOL, and CompuServe are all suddenly obsolete – and Mosaic is well on its way to becoming the world's standard interface":

When it comes to smashing a paradigm, pleasure is not the most important thing. It is the only thing. If this sounds wrong, consider Mosaic. Mosaic is the celebrated graphical "browser" that allows users to travel through the world of electronic information using a point-and-click interface. Mosaic's charming appearance encourages users to load their own documents onto the Net, including color photos, sound bites, video clips, and hypertext "links" to other documents. By following the links – click, and the linked document appears – you can travel through the online world along paths of whim and intuition. Mosaic is not the most direct way to find online information. Nor is it the most powerful. It is merely the most pleasurable way, and in the 18 months since it was released, Mosaic has incited a rush of excitement and commercial energy unprecedented in the history of the Net.

Reid also refers to Matthew K. Gray's website, Internet Statistics: Growth and Usage of the Web and the Internet, which indicates a dramatic leap in web use around the time of Mosaic's introduction.

David Hudson concurs with Reid:

Marc Andreessen's realization of Mosaic, based on the work of Berners-Lee and the hypertext theorists before him, is generally recognized as the beginning of the web as it is now known. Mosaic, the first web browser to win over the masses, was released in 1993 and made freely accessible to the public. The adjective phenomenal, so often overused in this industry, is genuinely applicable to the... 'explosion' in the growth of the web after Mosaic appeared on the scene. Starting with next to nothing, the rates of the web growth (quoted in the press) hovering around tens of thousands of percent over ridiculously short periods of time were no real surprise.

Ultimately, web browsers such as Mosaic became the killer applications of the 1990s. Web browsers were the first to bring a graphical interface to search tools, the Internet's burgeoning wealth of distributed information services. A mid-1994 guide lists Mosaic alongside the traditional, text-oriented information search tools of the time, Archie and Veronica, Gopher, and WAIS but Mosaic quickly subsumed and displaced them all. Joseph Hardin, the director of the NCSA group within which Mosaic was developed, said downloads were up to 50,000 a month in mid-1994.

In November 1992, there were twenty-six websites in the world and each one attracted attention. In its release year of 1993, Mosaic had a What's New page, and about one new link was being added per day. This was a time when access to the Internet was expanding rapidly outside its previous domain of academia and large industrial research institutions. Yet it was the availability of Mosaic and Mosaic-derived graphical browsers themselves that drove the explosive growth of the Web to over 10,000 sites by August 1995 and millions by 1998. Metcalfe expressed the pivotal role of Mosaic this way:

In the Web's first generation, Tim Berners-Lee launched the Uniform Resource Locator (URL), Hypertext Transfer Protocol (HTTP), and HTML standards with prototype Unix-based servers and browsers. A few people noticed that the Web might be better than Gopher.

In the second generation, Marc Andreessen and Eric Bina developed NCSA Mosaic at the University of Illinois. Several million then suddenly noticed that the Web might be better than sex.

In the third generation, Andreessen and Bina left NCSA to found Netscape...

— Bob Metcalfe

== Legacy ==
Netscape Navigator was later developed by Netscape, which employed many of the original Mosaic authors; however, it intentionally shared no code with Mosaic. Netscape Navigator's code descendant is Mozilla Firefox; the name "Mozilla" was a corrupted portmanteau of "Mosaic killer".

Spyglass, Inc. licensed the technology and trademarks from NCSA for producing its own web browser but never used any of the NCSA Mosaic source code. Microsoft licensed Spyglass Mosaic in 1995 for US$2 million, modified it, and renamed it Internet Explorer. After a later auditing dispute, Microsoft paid Spyglass $8 million. The 1995 user guide The HTML Sourcebook: The Complete Guide to HTML, specifically states, in a section called Coming Attractions, that Internet Explorer "will be based on the Mosaic program". Versions of Internet Explorer before version 7 stated "Based on NCSA Mosaic" in the About box. Internet Explorer 7 was audited by Microsoft to ensure that it contained no Spyglass Mosaic code, and thus no longer credits Spyglass or Mosaic.

After NCSA stopped work on Mosaic, development of the NCSA Mosaic for the X Window System source code was continued by several independent groups. These independent development efforts include mMosaic (multicast Mosaic), which ceased development in early 2004, and Mosaic-CK and VMS Mosaic.

VMS Mosaic, a version specifically targeting OpenVMS operating system, is one of the longest-lived efforts to maintain Mosaic. Using the VMS support already built-in in the original version (Bjorn S. Nilsson ported Mosaic 1.2 to VMS in the summer of 1993), developers incorporated a substantial part of the HTML engine from mMosaic, another defunct flavor of the browser. As of the most recent version (4.2), released in 2007, VMS Mosaic supported HTML 4.0, OpenSSL, cookies, and various image formats including GIF, JPEG, PNG, BMP, TGA, TIFF and JPEG 2000 image formats. The browser works on VAX, Alpha, and Itanium platforms.

Another long-lived version, Mosaic-CK, developed by Cameron Kaiser, was last released (version 2.7ck9) on July 11, 2010; a maintenance release with minor compatibility fixes (version 2.7ck10) was released on January 9, 2015, followed by another one (2.7ck11) in October 2015. The stated goal of the project is "Lynx with graphics" and runs on Mac OS X, Power MachTen, Linux and other compatible Unix-like OSs.

== Release history ==
The X, Windows, and Mac versions of Mosaic all had separate development teams and code bases.

Key:
Internal Build	Pre-release	Stable release

=== Unix ===
Series	Version	Release date	Notes & features	Supported platforms
0.x	0.1	Dec, 1992	Browse plaintext and HTML documents, Gopher servers, anonymous FTP servers, and local files; HTTP/0.9	
0.x	0.2		Fixed fatal bug in 0.1	
0.x	0.3		Support for NCSA's DTM (broadcasts documents to real-time networked workgroup collaboration sessions)	
0.x	0.4			
0.x	0.5	Jan 23, 1993	Initial public release (as NCSA X Mosaic). Save/mail/print; History list; On-the-fly font selection; Hotlist	SGI (IRIX 4.0.2); IBM (AIX 3.2); Sun 4 (SunOS 4.1.2)
0.x	0.6	Jan 31, 1993	Different colors for visited links; Specify a start page	SGI (IRIX 4.0.2); IBM (AIX 3.2); Sun 4 (SunOS 4.1.2)
0.x	0.7	Feb 11, 1993	Links are now underlined; Able to mouse-select each character of text on a web page; Annotations; Program logo in top-right corner (predecessor to throbber)	All Above + DEC Ultrix
0.x	0.8	Feb 14, 1993		All Above + DEC Ultrix
0.x	0.9	Mar 4, 1993	Audio annotations (SGI only); Product name changed to NCSA Mosaic for the X Window System	All Above + DEC Ultrix
0.x	0.10	Mar 14, 1993	Introduced <IMG> tag: inlined images (GIF & XBM) in HTML documents; Find in page	All Above + DEC Ultrix
0.x	0.11	Mar 17, 1993		All Above + DEC Ultrix
0.x	0.12	Apr 5, 1993	Support for <OL>, <TT>, <B>, <I>, <EM>, <STRONG>, <CODE>, <SAMP>, <KBD>, <VAR>	All Above + SCO Open Desktop; Harris Nighthawk
0.x	0.13	Apr 12, 1993		All Above + SCO Open Desktop; Harris Nighthawk
1.x	1.0	Apr 21, 1993		All Above + Solaris 2.x DEC alpha (OSF/1); Dell SVR4; HP/UX 7.x, 8.x, 9.x NeXT BSD
1.x	1.1-pre1	May 31, 1993		All Above + Solaris 2.x DEC alpha (OSF/1); Dell SVR4; HP/UX 7.x, 8.x, 9.x NeXT BSD
1.x	1.1-pre2	Jun 2, 1993		All Above + Solaris 2.x DEC alpha (OSF/1); Dell SVR4; HP/UX 7.x, 8.x, 9.x NeXT BSD
1.x	1.1	Jun 4, 1993	Image map support; Print/save to PostScript; Support for <CITE> and <BLOCKQUOTE>; Support for group annotation servers	All Above + Solaris 2.x DEC alpha (OSF/1); Dell SVR4; HP/UX 7.x, 8.x, 9.x NeXT BSD
1.x	1.2	Jun 30, 1993	Support for file://localhost/ scheme for accessing local files; Many bug fixes and under-hood improvements	All Above + Solaris 2.x DEC alpha (OSF/1); Dell SVR4; HP/UX 7.x, 8.x, 9.x NeXT BSD
2.x	2.0-pre0	Jul 21, 1993	Displays the URL when the mouse hovers over a link; "Search Keyword" area removed from the bottom (moved to the menu dialog box)	
2.x	2.0-pre1	Aug 2, 1993		
2.x	2.0-pre2	Aug 10, 1993	Reload button now also reloads images	
2.x	2.0-pre3	Sep 5, 1993	Support for forms; Support for <BR>, <HR>, <STRIKE>; HTTP/1.0 compliant	
2.x	2.0-pre4	Sep 29, 1993	Can stop page loading; <IMG ALIGN> attribute support	
2.x	2.0-pre5	Oct 10, 1993	Form INPUT types of RADIO, PASSWORD, OPTION added; Program logo becomes a throbber (now animates during page loads)	
2.x	2.0-pre6	Oct 20, 1993		
2.x	2.0-pre7	Nov 2, 1993		
2.x	2.0-pre8	Nov 7, 1993	New colorful spinning globe throbber	
2.x	2.0	Nov 10, 1993		SunOS 4.1.3; Solaris 2.3; AIX 3.2.4 with X11R5; IRIX 4.x DEC alpha (OSF/1); DEC Ultrix; HP/UX 9.x (700 Series)
2.x	2.1	Dec 11, 1993		SunOS 4.1.3; Solaris 2.3; AIX 3.2.4 with X11R5; IRIX 4.x DEC alpha (OSF/1); DEC Ultrix; HP/UX 9.x (700 Series)
2.x	2.2	Feb 9, 1994		All from 2.1 + IRIX 5.1.x
2.x	2.3	Apr 8, 1994		All from 2.1 + IRIX 5.1.x
2.x	2.4	Apr 11, 1994	Fixes a major bug with forms introduced in 2.3; Last widely used release of NCSA Mosaic for X	All from 2.1 + IRIX 5.1.x
2.x	2.5 alpha 1	Sep 22, 1994	Limited support for tables; Kiosk Mode; Nested Hotlists; Common Client Interface (CCI) API	SunOS 4.1.3; Solaris 2.3; AIX 3.2.4; IRIX 4.0.x and 5.x DEC alpha (OSF/1 1.3 and 3.0); DEC Ultrix 4.x HP/UX 7.x, 8.x, 9.x Linux 1.1.94
2.x	2.5 beta 1		Support for <SUP> and <SUB>	SunOS 4.1.3; Solaris 2.3; AIX 3.2.4; IRIX 4.0.x and 5.x DEC alpha (OSF/1 1.3 and 3.0); DEC Ultrix 4.x HP/UX 7.x, 8.x, 9.x Linux 1.1.94
2.x	2.5 beta 2	Oct 11, 1994	Removed the word "Document" from the Title and URL fields	SunOS 4.1.3; Solaris 2.3; AIX 3.2.4; IRIX 4.0.x and 5.x DEC alpha (OSF/1 1.3 and 3.0); DEC Ultrix 4.x HP/UX 7.x, 8.x, 9.x Linux 1.1.94
2.x	2.5 beta 3	Dec 22, 1994	Support for <U> (underline)	SunOS 4.1.3; Solaris 2.3; AIX 3.2.4; IRIX 4.0.x and 5.x DEC alpha (OSF/1 1.3 and 3.0); DEC Ultrix 4.x HP/UX 7.x, 8.x, 9.x Linux 1.1.94
2.x	2.5 beta 4			SunOS 4.1.3; Solaris 2.3; AIX 3.2.4; IRIX 4.0.x and 5.x DEC alpha (OSF/1 1.3 and 3.0); DEC Ultrix 4.x HP/UX 7.x, 8.x, 9.x Linux 1.1.94
2.x	2.5 beta 5	Mar 4, 1995		SunOS 4.1.3; Solaris 2.3; AIX 3.2.4; IRIX 4.0.x and 5.x DEC alpha (OSF/1 1.3 and 3.0); DEC Ultrix 4.x HP/UX 7.x, 8.x, 9.x Linux 1.1.94
2.x	2.5	Mar 12, 1995		SunOS 4.1.3; Solaris 2.3; AIX 3.2.4; IRIX 4.0.x and 5.x DEC alpha (OSF/1 1.3 and 3.0); DEC Ultrix 4.x HP/UX 7.x, 8.x, 9.x Linux 1.1.94
2.x	2.6 alpha 1		Inline JPEGs; Can now enter URLs directly into the address bar and press return to load them; Support for mailto: links	All from 2.5 + Solaris 2.4
2.x	2.6 alpha 2			All from 2.5 + Solaris 2.4
2.x	2.6 beta 1	Apr 6, 1995		All from 2.5 + Solaris 2.4
2.x	2.6 beta 2	May 20, 1995		All from 2.5 + Solaris 2.4
2.x	2.6 beta 3			All from 2.5 + Solaris 2.4
2.x	2.6	Jul 6, 1995	Official "final" release	All from 2.5 + Solaris 2.4
2.x	2.7 beta 1	Jul 27, 1995	Inline PNGs; Support for SSL (MD5 & Kerberos 4/5); Security Icon in lower-left corner of window; Keepalive connections	SunOS 4.1.3; Solaris 2.3 and 2.4; AIX 4.4; IRIX 4.0.x and 5.x DEC alpha (OSF/1 1.3 and 3.0); DEC Ultrix 4.x HP/UX 7.x, 8.x, 9.x Linux 1.2.13; BSD/OS 2.1
2.x	2.7 beta 2	Oct 19, 1995	Document title moved to window Title Bar; Load progress bar in lower-right corner of window	SunOS 4.1.3; Solaris 2.3 and 2.4; AIX 4.4; IRIX 4.0.x and 5.x DEC alpha (OSF/1 1.3 and 3.0); DEC Ultrix 4.x HP/UX 7.x, 8.x, 9.x Linux 1.2.13; BSD/OS 2.1
2.x	2.7 beta 3	Feb 26, 1996	Background colors; Can enter URLs without http:// prefix; Detachable Toolbar; Contextual right-click menus; Support for border attribute for linked images; action=mailto support in forms; Splash screen; Customizable Throbber; New application icons	SunOS 4.1.3; Solaris 2.3 and 2.4; AIX 4.4; IRIX 4.0.x and 5.x DEC alpha (OSF/1 1.3 and 3.0); DEC Ultrix 4.x HP/UX 7.x, 8.x, 9.x Linux 1.2.13; BSD/OS 2.1
2.x	2.7 beta 4	Mar 30, 1996	Background Images; Cleaned up and colorized toolbar icons; User Agent spoofing	SunOS 4.1.3; Solaris 2.3 and 2.4; AIX 4.4; IRIX 4.0.x and 5.x DEC alpha (OSF/1 1.3 and 3.0); DEC Ultrix 4.x HP/UX 7.x, 8.x, 9.x Linux 1.2.13; BSD/OS 2.1
2.x	2.7 beta 5	Jul 18, 1996	Printing in Kiosk Mode	All from 2.7b4 + SCO System V 3.2
2.x	2.8 alpha 1	Aug 20, 1996	A complete rewrite code-named "Project: Hyperion": Supports HTML 3.2; Options for loose or strict HTML parsing; Style sheets	
2.x	2.8 alpha 2	Sep 10, 1996		
2.x	2.8 alpha 3	Nov 14, 1996		

=== Windows ===
Series	Version	Release date	Notes & features
0.x	0.1a	Jun, 1993	Support for inline GIFs; Support for .au sound files; Optional status bar to display hyperlink destinations; Customizable font selection
0.x	0.2a		Local file support; User-configurable Hotlist
0.x	0.3a		Support for inline XBMs; Option to set a start page; Support for AIFF sound files
0.x	0.4a		Support for <BR>, <B>, and <I>
0.x	0.5a	Sep 16, 1993	Find in page; Image caching; Much faster scrolling; Hyperlinks to anchors within a document; Standard file dialog to open files on local disk; Drag and Drop local files into browser
0.x	0.6b	Sep 28, 1993	Image map support; Support for <HR>; Scrolling via keys
0.x	0.7b	Oct 17,1993	Document caching; HTTP/1.0 compliant
1.x	1.0	Nov 11, 1993	Can stop page loading; Images can now be aligned middle, top, or bottom; Better-looking horizontal rules
2.x	2.0 alpha 1	Jan 31, 1994	Support for forms; Inlined image caching across pages
2.x	2.0 alpha 2	Feb 28, 1994	New Hotlist/Menu UI; DNS caching; Faster GIF decoding; Support for form INPUT type HIDDEN
2.x	2.0 alpha 3	Apr 6, 1994	Application is now 32-bit; Can now print documents; Viewing and saving document source; Support for <EM> and <STRONG>; Horizontal scrollbars for documents wider than the screen
2.x	2.0 alpha 4	Apr 14, 1994	
2.x	2.0 alpha 5	Jun 24, 1994	Can now enter URLs directly into the address bar and press return to load them; Colorized toolbar icons; XBM images decode 100 times faster
2.x	2.0 alpha 6	Jul 27, 1994	"Document Title:" bar removed (document title moved to window Title Bar), "Document URL:" caption shortened to just "URL:" for address bar; Smaller Throbber; Links are now underlined; Kiosk Mode; Speed improvements; Memory issue fixes
2.x	2.0 alpha 7	Sep 7, 1994	Throbber changes size relative to how many toolbars are shown; Mouse-over tooltips added
2.x	2.0 alpha 8	Dec 20, 1994	Support for tables; Support for <U>, <S>/<STRIKE>, <SUP>/<SUPER>, <SUB>; Support for transparent GIFs; No longer crashes when encountering bad HTML; Refined Throbber graphics (wires)
2.x	2.0 alpha 9	Jan 25, 1995	Cancel and Check buttons added next to address bar; Presentation mode; Right-click menu options; Support for mailto: links
2.x	2.0.0 beta 1	Mar 13, 1995	Inline JPEGs; Support for ALT information in IMG tags; Can now tab from one form field to another; Hotlist Manager; Splash screen; ± keys to change font sizes;
2.x	2.0.0 beta 2	Mar 23, 1995	Support for multiple mailto:
2.x	2.0.0 beta 3	Mar 28, 1995	256 character URL limit fixed
2.x	2.0.0 beta 4	Apr 6, 1995	Global History; New HTML 3.0 tag attributes; URL bar is now also a list box
2.x	2.0.0 final beta	Jul 12, 1995	Speed and printing improvements
2.x	2.0.0	Oct 11, 1995	Discrete Stop Button in toolbar; Collaborative Sessions; Advanced Hotlist Manager; Internal support for .wav sound files; Internal .au support removed; Printing improvements
2.x	2.1.0	Mar 14, 1996	Support for client-side image maps; Support for Kodak Photo CD (.pcd) image format
2.x	2.1.1	Mar 25, 1996	Fixed inline JPEGs not working with inline Kodak Photo CD images
3.x	3.0	Jan 7, 1997	Final Release

=== Macintosh ===
Series	Version	Release date	Notes & features
1.x	1.0	Nov 10, 1993	Background color is white by default (differing from X and Windows versions)
1.x	1.0.1	Nov 29, 1993	
1.x	1.0.2	Dec 17, 1993	
1.x	1.0.3	Jan 27, 1994	Fixed serious crashes; Improved speed
2.x	2.0 alpha 1	Jun 10, 1994	Support for forms and tables; Users can now enter URLs directly into the address bar and press return to load them (URL bar is hidden by default); Background color is now gray by default (like X and Windows versions); Support for <S>, <SUP>, <SUB>; Reload button; New Hotlist interface
2.x	2.0 alpha 2	Jun 21, 1994	
2.x	2.0 alpha 3	Jul 12, 1994	
2.x	2.0 alpha 6	Jul 26, 1994	
2.x	2.0 alpha 8	Sep 16, 1994	
2.x	2.0 alpha 17	Nov 14, 1994	
2.x	2.0 beta 1	Mar 6, 1995	Inline JPEGs; Support for mailto: links
2.x	2.0 beta 2		
2.x	2.0 beta 3	Mar 15, 1995	
2.x	2.0 beta 4		
2.x	2.0 beta 5	Apr 6, 1995	
2.x	2.0 beta 6		HTML Parser is much faster; Throbber globe wires now display moving arrows and yellow ball proportional to percent of page loaded; Support for <CENTER>, <BIG>, <SMALL>, and IMG tag ALIGN=LEFT/RIGHT attributes
2.x	2.0 beta 7	Apr 27, 1995	
2.x	2.0 beta 8		Support for <P ALIGN>; Image alignment improvements
2.x	2.0 beta 9	May 5, 1995	
2.x	2.0 beta 10		
2.x	2.0 beta 11		
2.x	2.0 beta 12	Jun 1, 1995	
2.x	2.0 beta 13		Support for background images
2.x	2.0 beta 14		
2.x	2.0.0		
2.x	2.0.1	Sep 28, 1995	Fixed some table rendering bugs
3.x	3.0.0 beta 1	Apr 15, 1996	
3.x	3.0.0 beta 2	Apr 25, 1996	
3.x	3.0.0 beta 3	Jul 30, 1996	
3.x	3.0.0 beta 4	Sep 12, 1996	
3.x	3.0	Jan 7, 1997	Final Release - Nested tables; Removed frames support that was present in 3.0.0 betas

== See also ==
- Comparison of web browsers
- History of the web browser
- History of the World Wide Web
- List of software developed at universities
- List of web browsers
- Timeline of the history of the Internet
- Usage share of web browsers
