= EdgeHTML =

Browser engine of Microsoft Edge (2015–2021)

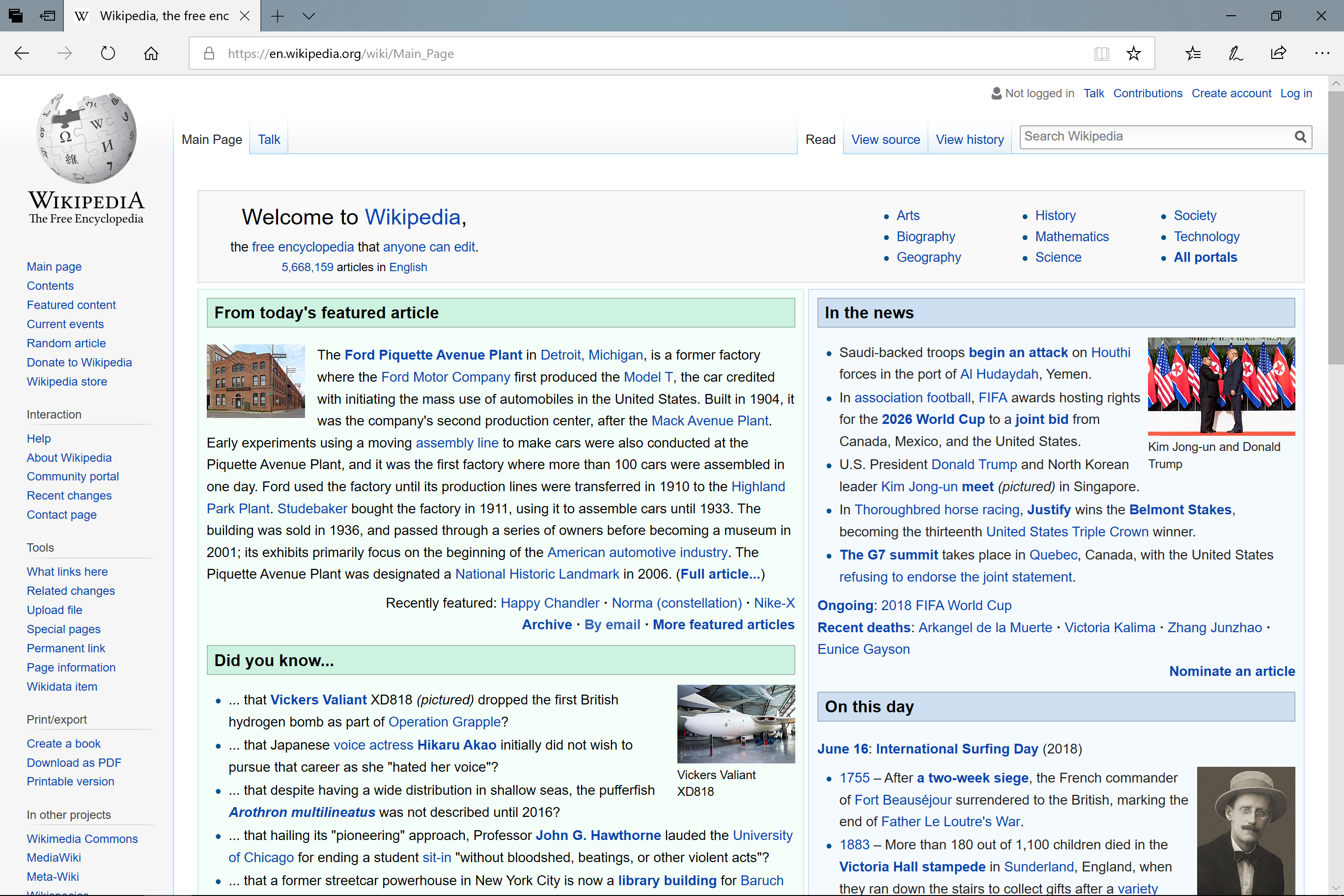
- Microsoft Edge Legacy, powered by EdgeHTML, displaying a Wikipedia page in 2018
- Developer: Microsoft
- Stable release: 18.19041 / May 27, 2020; 5 years ago
- Written in: C++
- Operating system: Windows 10; Windows 10 Mobile; Xbox system software
- Predecessor: MSHTML
- Successor: Blink
- Type: Browser engine
- License: Proprietary
- Website: docs.microsoft.com/en-us/archive/microsoft-edge/legacy/developer/dev-guide/

EdgeHTML is a proprietary browser engine from Microsoft that was used in Microsoft Edge Legacy, which debuted in 2015 as part of Windows 10.

EdgeHTML is a fork of the MSHTML (Trident) engine of Internet Explorer. It is designed as a software component that enables developers easily to add web browsing functionality to other apps.

In 2018, Microsoft began rebuilding Edge as a Chromium-based browser, which meant that EdgeHTML would no longer be used in the Edge browser. This transition was completed in April 2021. Past this date, EdgeHTML does, however, continue to be supported and used in Universal Windows Platform apps.

== History ==
Microsoft first introduced the EdgeHTML rendering engine as part of Internet Explorer 11 in the Windows Technical Preview build 9879 on November 12, 2014. Microsoft planned to use EdgeHTML both in Internet Explorer and Project Spartan; in Internet Explorer it would exist alongside the Trident 7 engine from Internet Explorer 11, the latter being used for compatibility purposes. However, Microsoft decided to ship Internet Explorer 11 in Windows 10 as it was in Windows 8.1, leaving EdgeHTML only for the then new Edge [Legacy] browser. EdgeHTML was also added to Windows 10 Mobile and the second Windows Server 2016 Technical Preview. It was officially released on July 29, 2015, as part of Windows 10.

Unlike Trident, EdgeHTML does not support ActiveX. It also drops support for the X-UA-Compatible header, used by Trident to determine in which version it had to render a certain page. Microsoft also dropped the usage of Compatibility View-lists. Edge will recognize if a page requires any of the removed technologies to run properly and suggest to the user to open the page in Internet Explorer instead. Another change was spoofing the user agent string, which claims to be Chrome and Safari, while also mentioning KHTML and Gecko, so that web servers that use user agent sniffing send Edge users the full versions of web pages instead of reduced-functionality pages.

EdgeHTML's rendering was meant to be fully compatible with the rendering of the Blink and WebKit layout engines, used by Google Chrome and Safari, respectively. At the time, Microsoft stated that "any Edge-WebKit differences are bugs that we’re interested in fixing."

Breaking from Trident, the new EdgeHTML engine was focused on modern web standards and interoperability, rather than compatibility. The initial release of EdgeHTML on Windows 10 included more than 4000 interoperability fixes.

On August 18, 2015, Microsoft released the first preview to EdgeHTML platform version 13 as part of Windows 10.0.10525, though it was still labeled as version 12. In subsequent updates, the support for HTML5 and CSS3 was extended to include new elements.

EdgeHTML 13.10586 was released in multiple versions of Windows. On November 12, 2015, the New Xbox One Experience-update for the Xbox One included EdgeHTML 13.10586, replacing Internet Explorer 10 in the process. It was released to Windows 10 as part of the November Update on the same day. On November 18, 2015, the update got rolled out to Windows 10 Mobile users in the Insider Preview. Finally, Microsoft rolled out the same update to Windows Server 2016 as part of Technical Preview 4.

On December 16, 2015, Microsoft released the first build of Redstone. In January and February 2016, 4 other builds followed, all laying the foundational work for EdgeHTML 14. On February 18, 2016, Microsoft released the first version of EdgeHTML 14 as version 14.14267. This version of the engine contained almost no changes in standards support yet, but contained fundamental work for Web Notifications, WebRTC 1.0, improved ECMAScript and CSS support and also contained a number of new flags. Further, Microsoft announced that it was working on VP9, WOFF 2.0, Web Speech API, WebM, FIDO 2.0, and Beacon API.

EdgeHTML has often been compared to Gecko due to its standards support and lack of compatibility with WebKit.

=== Releases ===
EdgeHTML version	Release date	Notes
12.0	November 12, 2014	Beta version that was part of a special Internet Explorer build
12.10049	March 31, 2015	Beta is now part of the Microsoft Edge browser
12.10166	July 9, 2015	
12.10240	July 15, 2015	Initial public release of Microsoft Edge. Contains improvements to performance, support for HTML5 and CSS3.
12.10525	August 18, 2015	This release contains initial groundwork for Object RTC in Microsoft Edge.
12.10532	August 27, 2015	New features such as Pointer Lock (Mouse Lock), Canvas blending modes, and new input types.
13.10547	September 18, 2015	Edge HTML has been updated to version 13, extended support for HTML5 and CSS3, Extended srcset (sizes), a[download] attribute, Canvas ellipse, SVG external content, WebRTC - Object RTC API (desktop).
13.10565	October 12, 2015	CSS initial and unset values, initial support for docked F12 Developer Tools.
13.10586	November 5, 2015	First public platform update, includes further enhancements to HTML5, including Object RTC support.
13.11099	January 13, 2016	
14.14267	February 18, 2016	Initial plumbing for Web Notifications support.
14.14279	March 4, 2016	
14.14291	March 17, 2016	Preview support for the VP9 video format on some devices.
14.14316	April 6, 2016	new Web Platform features
14.14327	April 20, 2016	Beacon interface and accessibility improvements.
14.14342	May 10, 2016	Web Notifications, Beacon, and Fetch APIs became enabled by default, Performance improvements for several common JavaScript APIs.
14.14352	May 26, 2016	H.264/AVC decoding became available through the ORTC API.
14.14356	June 1, 2016	Various performance and reliability improvements and bug fixes.
14.14361	June 8, 2016	TCP Fast Open is now disabled by default.
14.14366	June 14, 2016	Fixed an issue that could result in abnormally high CPU usage when open to a page with many animated GIFs, as well as an issue resulting in certain captchas not displaying correctly.
14.14367	June 16, 2016	Improvements to reduce battery usage on Windows 10 Mobile when Microsoft Edge is running in the background.
14.14376	June 28, 2016	
14.14393	August 2, 2016	
14.14901	August 11, 2016	
14.14915	August 31, 2016	Partial implementation of Webkit-Text-Stroke and CSS outline-offset, partial support for WebRTC 1.0.
14.14926	September 14, 2016	Improved performance on websites with changes to large numbers of HTML Elements containing text by improving spellchecker efficiency. This results in substantially improved performance on websites like TweetDeck. Addressed the largest cause of reliability issues in Insider builds of Microsoft Edge, which should improve reliability on major sites such as Facebook and Outlook.
15.14942	October 7, 2016	Enabled H.264/AVC support by default for RTC scenarios. Ongoing work to add support for CSS Custom Properties. Ongoing work to add support for CSP 2.0 and WebRTC 1.0
15.14959	November 3, 2016	
15.14986	December 7, 2016	
15.15063	April 11, 2017	
15.15254	October 11, 2017	Latest browser engine of Microsoft Edge for Windows 10 Mobile.
16.16299	October 8, 2017	WebAssembly enabled by default.
17.17134	April 30, 2018	
18.17763	November 13, 2018	
18.18362	May 21, 2019	
18.18363	November 12, 2019	
18.19041	May 27, 2020	

== See also ==
- Chakra, the JavaScript engine that worked in tandem with EdgeHTML in Microsoft Edge Legacy
- Comparison of browser engines
