= Zert =

Zert can refer to:

- Žert, a novel by Milan Kundera
- The Zeroday Emergency Response Team (ZERT), a group of volunteer security researchers who produced emergency patches for zero day attack vulnerabilities in proprietary software
