= Chakra (JavaScript engine) =

Open-source JavaScript engine developed by Microsoft

- Developer: Microsoft
- Stable release: 1.11.24 / December 8, 2020; 5 years ago
- Written in: C++
- Operating system: Windows, macOS, Linux
- Platform: IA-32, x86-64, ARM, ARM64
- Type: JavaScript engine
- License: MIT License
- Website: github.com/chakra-core/ChakraCore

Chakra is a discontinued free and open-source JavaScript engine developed by Microsoft for its Microsoft Edge Legacy web browser. It is a fork of the same-named JScript engine used in Internet Explorer. As with the EdgeHTML browser engine, the declared intention was that it would reflect the "Living Web". The core components of Chakra were open-sourced as ChakraCore. In 2021, Microsoft terminated support for the engine, citing its transition to a Chromium-based engine for Edge. Support has been transferred to the community, where it remains inactive.

== Standards support ==
Chakra supports ECMAScript 5.1 with partial support for ECMAScript 2015.

== Open sourcing ==
Following an initial announcement on December 5, 2015, Microsoft open sourced the Chakra engine as ChakraCore, including all the key components of the JavaScript engine powering Microsoft Edge [Legacy] on their GitHub page under the MIT License on January 13, 2016. ChakraCore is essentially the same as the Chakra engine that powers the Microsoft Edge Legacy browser, but with platform-agnostic bindings, i.e., without the specific interfaces utilized within the Universal Windows App platform.

Microsoft has also created a project on GitHub that allows Node.js to use ChakraCore as its JavaScript engine instead of V8.
