= SVG Working Group =

W3C research group

- Scalable Vector Graphics Working Group
- Abbreviation: SVG WG, SVGWG
- Founder: World Wide Web Consortium
- Type: Nonprofit working group
- Purpose: Developing the SVG language
- Products: SVG
- Owner: World Wide Web Consortium
- Website: www.w3.org/Graphics/SVG/

The SVG Working Group is a working group created by the World Wide Web Consortium (W3C) to address the need for an alternative to the PostScript document format. The PostScript format was unable to create scalable fonts and objects without creating files which were inordinately larger than a file which used unscalable fonts and objects.

In April 1998, the W3C received a note from representatives of four corporate entities – Adobe Systems, IBM, Netscape and Sun Microsystems – with regard to the Precision Graphics Markup Language (PGML), an XML-based markup language.

A second note was submitted came a month later from a team which included representatives of Hewlett-Packard, Macromedia, Microsoft, and Visio; the note contained a draft specification for the Vector Markup Language (VML), another XML-based markup language.

As a result of both missives, the W3C convened a working group, and within six months, the group published a working draft of requirements for the Scalable Vector Graphics (SVG) format. This format, unlike Postscript, is optimized for the Web. It is able to describe two-dimensional graphics and graphical applications via XML.

Initial versions of the SVG specification have now been natively implemented by most modern browsers. The SVG Working Group continues to work on enhancements, which will be published as a comprehensive SVG 2.0 specification. As of September 2014, the various modules of this new specification were expected to reach Candidate Recommendation status in 2015 or early 2016.

== Members ==
Members of the SVG Working Group include representatives from the following organizations:

- Adobe Systems Inc.
- Apple
- AutoCAD
- BitFlash
- Open Text (BitFlash Division)
- Canon, Inc.
- ERCIM
- Ericsson
- Expway
- France Telecom
- Groupe des Écoles des Télécommunications
- Ikivo AB
- ILOG
- Inkscape
- ITEDO Software GmbH
- KDDI Corporation
- Keio University
- Kodak
- Microsoft
- Mozilla
- Opera Software
- Research In Motion, Ltd. (RIM)
- Sharp Corporation
- Sun Microsystems Inc.

W3C has also invited several experts to collaborate with the working group.
