= Internet Explorer 10 =

Web browser by Microsoft for Windows released in 2012

- Screenshot of the Internet Explorer 10 Desktop app
- Developer: Microsoft
- Release: September 4, 2012; 14 years ago
- Final release: 10.0.185 (10.0.9200.22975) / February 12, 2020; 6 years ago
- Engine: MSHTML 6.0, Chakra
- Operating system: Windows 7 SP1; Windows Server 2008 R2 SP1
- Platform: IA-32, x64, and ARM
- Included with: Windows 8 Windows Server 2012
- Predecessor: Internet Explorer 9 (2011)
- Successor: Internet Explorer 11 (2013)
- Standards: HTML5, CSS3, H.264
- Type: Web browser Feed aggregator
- License: Proprietary, requires a Windows license
- Website: Internet Explorer 10 (archived at Wayback Machine)

Internet Explorer 10 (IE10) is the tenth and penultimate version of the Internet Explorer web browser and the successor to Internet Explorer 9, released by Microsoft on September 4, 2012. It is the default browser on Windows 8 and Windows Server 2012, and was later made available for Windows 7 and Windows Server 2008 R2.

IE10 expands on Internet Explorer 9 functionality with regard to CSS3 support, hardware acceleration, and HTML5 support. It is divided into two editions with different user interfaces: a Metro app that does not support plug-ins and a traditional desktop application that retains plug-in support. On 64-bit computers, the Metro edition runs in 64-bit mode by default. The desktop edition can be run in 64-bit mode by enabling Enhanced Protected Mode.

== Product life cycle ==
On April 12, 2011, Microsoft released the first "IE10 Platform Preview". The first preview release came four weeks after the final release of Internet Explorer 9. IE10 reached general availability on September 4, 2012. A preview of IE10 was made available for download on November 5, 2012. On November 13, 2012, Internet Explorer 10 and the Platform Update were made available for download to all users.

Support for Internet Explorer 10 on most Windows versions ended on January 12, 2016, when Microsoft began requiring customers to use the latest version of Internet Explorer available for each Windows version. On February 12, 2020, Microsoft released the final IE10 update, despite originally promising to end support in January 2020 for Windows Server 2012 and Windows Embedded 8 Standard. This marked the end of IE10 support on all platforms after the transitional support grace period ended following IE11 finally being made available for Windows Server 2012 and Windows Embedded 8 Standard in April 2019.

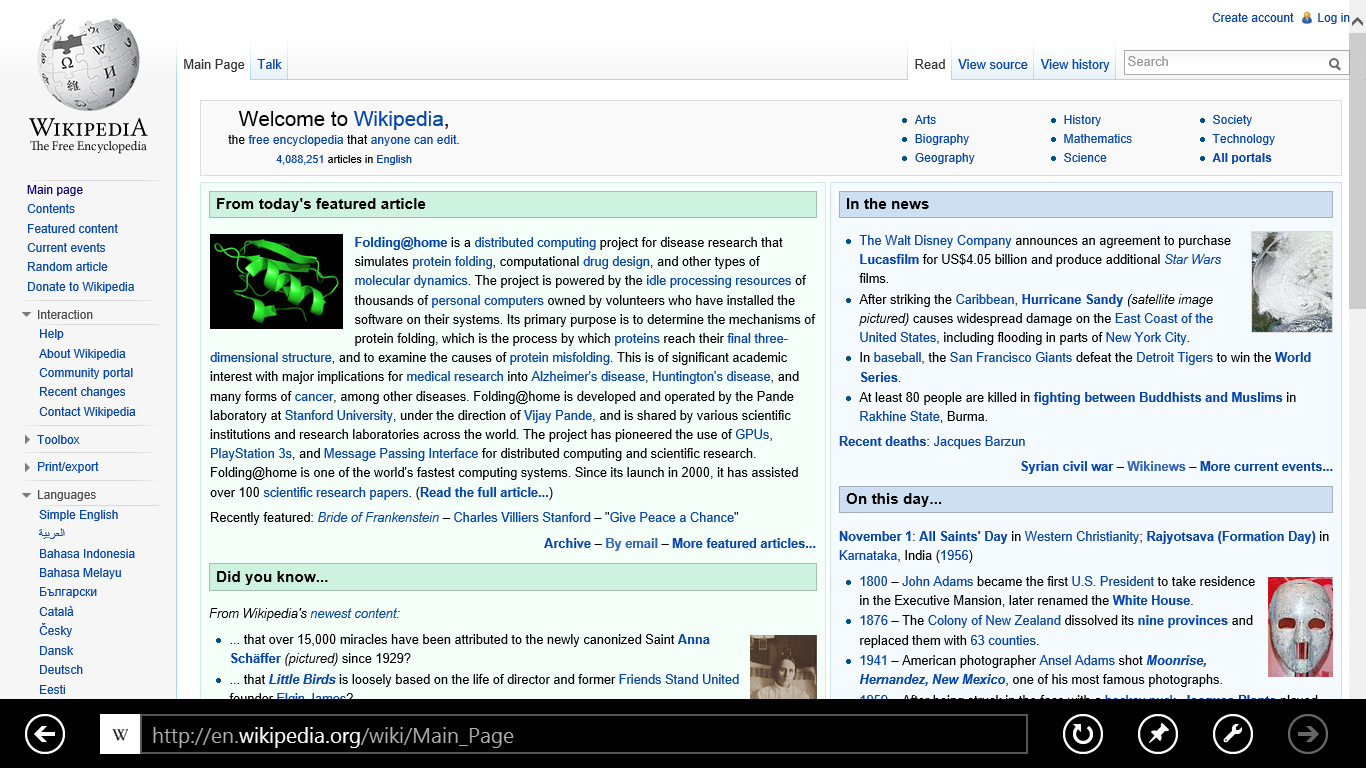
Screenshot of the Internet Explorer 10 Metro app

== History ==
Internet Explorer 10 was first announced on April 12, 2011, at the MIX 11 conference in Las Vegas. In this conference, Microsoft showcased a demo version of Internet Explorer 10. On the same day, a Platform Preview of Internet Explorer 10 was released on the Internet Explorer Test Drive website. Internet Explorer 10 Platform Preview 1 supports CSS3 grid layout, CSS3 flexible box layout, CSS3 multi-column layout, CSS3 gradient, and full hardware acceleration.

Reviewers' responses to the release of Internet Explorer 10 Platform Preview were varied; however, they noted how soon (29 days) after the release of Internet Explorer 9 Microsoft began talking about the next version. While Don Reisinger of eWeek listed his requested features for the next version, Michael Muchmore of PC Magazine tested Platform Preview 1's performance and HTML5 support with both Microsoft's and third parties' test suites. In his test, Platform Preview 1 performed better than Internet Explorer 9 but not always better than the competing web browsers.

On September 13, 2011, Microsoft released the developer preview of Internet Explorer 10 to the general public (the first full browser incarnation). Although Internet Explorer is the last major web browser among Mozilla Firefox, Google Chrome, Opera, and Safari to support spell checking, it is the first desktop browser on Windows to support autocorrection.

Internet Explorer 10 was released to manufacturing on August 1, 2012. The latter reached general availability on September 4, 2012 while the former reached general availability on October 26, 2012. A preview of Internet Explorer 10 was released on November 13, 2012. It does not support versions earlier than Windows 7.

== New features ==
=== Adobe Flash integration ===
Internet Explorer 10 includes a built-in Adobe Flash Player. Microsoft and Adobe worked together to ensure that the version of Adobe Flash included with Internet Explorer 10 does not drain the battery or impact performance in negative ways. In the "Metro" version of Internet Explorer, only some of the features of Adobe Flash will be included for battery life, performance and security purposes. Some features that do not work well with touch have also been removed from the "Metro" version of Internet Explorer. However, originally, not all websites can use Adobe Flash in the "Metro" version of Internet Explorer as Microsoft and Adobe maintain a list of approved websites that are, reportedly, video content and some games. In the desktop version of Internet Explorer 10, all of the features of Adobe Flash are available.
On March 12, 2013, Microsoft changed this behavior from allowing only sites on a whitelist to display flash content, to allowing all sites to display flash content except those on a curated Compatibility View (CV) list (blacklist) maintained by Microsoft.

=== User interface ===
The desktop version of Internet Explorer 10 retains the user interface (UI) of Internet Explorer 9 with minor refinements, such as removing gradients. The Metro version of Internet Explorer 10 includes a new UI, most of which is hidden so that the webpage being viewed takes up the entire screen.

The UI can be revealed by a right click of the mouse or by a swipe from the top or bottom edges of a touchscreen. When the UI is shown, the tabs are listed on the top of the screen, with a small preview of the webpage on each tab. A button to add a new tab is placed in the top-right corner. At the bottom of the screen, the address bar and navigational buttons are shown. Navigational buttons include the Back button (to navigate to the previous page), the Refresh button (to reload active page), the Pin button (which create a new shortcut tile for the active page on the Start screen), and a wrench-shaped icon, which opens the only menu of IE10. It contains options such as "View on Desktop", which opens the current webpage on the desktop version of Internet Explorer 10, and "Find on page", which can find a text string (a word, phrase or arbitrary set of letters) in the active page.

=== Flip Ahead ===
Internet Explorer 10 also introduces a new feature called Flip Ahead. This works in both Metro and desktop versions of Internet Explorer 10. It allows users to move through articles that span multiple pages as well as search results and other web pages with a "next page" or similar button. This feature is turned off by default as a user's browsing history is sent to Microsoft to provide the feature. According to the Windows SuperSite, Microsoft has said that some sites may need to be updated to ensure it will work as intended.

=== Miscellaneous ===
Internet Explorer 10 is the first web browser to support smooth CSS transitions of linear gradients.

=== Release history ===
Name	New features
Internet Explorer 10 Platform Preview	Support for CSS3 multi-column layout, CSS3 grid layout, CSS3 flexible box layout, CSS3 gradients, ES5 strict mode, and a new user agent string (see §User agent string).
Internet Explorer 10 Platform Preview 2	Support for Positioned Floats, CSS stylesheet limit lifted, CSSOM Floating Point Value support, Improved hit testing APIs, Media Query Listeners, HTML5: Support for async attribute on script elements, HTML5 Drag and Drop, HTML5 File API, HTML5 Sandbox, HTML5 Web Workers, and some Web Performance APIs.
Internet Explorer 10 Developer Preview	Support for Windows 8, CSS 3D Transforms, CSS Text shadow, SVG Filter Effects, Spellchecking, Autocorrection, local storage with IndexedDB and the HTML5 Application Cache, Web Sockets, HTML5 History, and InPrivate tabs.
Internet Explorer 10 Platform Preview 4	Cross-Origin Resource Sharing, File API Writer, JavaScript Typed Arrays (WebGL), CSS user select property, HTML5 Video Text Captioning, and Updated Quirks Mode.
Internet Explorer 10 Consumer Preview	Cross-Origin Resource Sharing (CORS) for XMLHttpRequest, CSS -ms-user-select property, CSS3 font-feature-settings property to access advanced OpenType features, Document setting to enable floating point values in CSS-OM, HTML5 BlobBuilder API and new APIs to save or open files, HTML5 track element for HTML5 video captions, Interoperable HTML5 Quirks mode, JavaScript Typed Arrays, Meta tag to alert user that site requires ActiveX add-ons available only in desktop IE10, removal of legacy graphics features from IE10 standards mode, changes to support latest HTML5 WebSocket API, and Web Worker thread pooling.
Internet Explorer 10 Release Preview	Removal of app switch button, new UI for search results, integration of touch-friendly Adobe Flash Player, Flip Ahead, "Do not track"-flag set by default, removal of legacy DX filters from all of the document modes (can be re-enabled using the Internet Options dialog), and support for (CSS transitions, transforms, animations, gradients, and CSS Fonts’ font-feature-settings property, as well as platform APIs such as the Indexed Database API (IndexedDB) and requestAnimationFrame()) in their unprefixed forms, but still supports their prefixed forms.
Internet Explorer 10	None. Generally, there are no significant changes between a release candidate and release to manufacturing except bug fixes.

== Discontinued features ==
Internet Explorer 10 no longer features or supports the following:

- Conditional comments in HTML (JavaScript conditional comments still work)
- DirectX-based filters and transitions (DX filters)
- Element behaviors and HTML Components (HTCs)
- XML data islands
- Vector Markup Language (VML)
- Content Advisor (taken over by Windows Parental Controls or Microsoft Family Safety)

== Mobile version ==
At the Windows Phone Developer Summit in June 2012, Joe Belfiore announced Windows Phone 8 due towards the end of 2012, which will include a mobile version of Internet Explorer 10 that offers four times faster JavaScript performance and two times more support for HTML 5 features. It includes Microsoft SmartScreen and supports touch in HTML5 apps.

== User agent string ==
Internet Explorer 10 has a new user agent string which has the following general format:

Mozilla/5.0 (compatible; MSIE 10.0; Windows NT 6.2; [platform token] Trident/6.0; Touch)

Depending on the system, different parts of this user string may change. The last token, "Touch", only appears on systems equipped with a touchscreen. The platform token may be any of the following:

Platform token
Value	Condition
Nothing	Absence of the platform token indicates that Internet Explorer is running on a 32-bit version of Windows
WOW64;	Indicates that a 32-bit version of Internet Explorer is running on a 64-bit version of Windows
Win64; x64;	Indicates that a 64-bit version of Internet Explorer is running on a 64-bit version of Windows
ARM;	Indicates that Internet Explorer 10 is running on Windows RT

== Notes ==
A. Refers to the Internet Explorer (engine) version, not the Platform Preview version
B. Platform Preview version is 2.10.1000.16394
C. Platform Preview version is 2.10.1008.16421
D. This version is only included as part of Windows 8 Developer Preview, and is a full version rather than a usual Platform Preview.
E. Platform Preview version is 2.10.0.8103.0. Does not replace Internet Explorer Developer Preview. This Platform Preview is compatible only with Windows Developer Preview.

Preceded by Internet Explorer 9	Internet Explorer 10; 2012	Succeeded by Internet Explorer 11
