= Internet Explorer 11 =

Web browser by Microsoft for Windows released in 2013

- Screenshot of Internet Explorer 11
- Developer: Microsoft
- Release: October 17, 2013; 13 years ago
- Stable release: 11.0.1000 (11.0.9600.23450) / October 13, 2026; 40 days ago
- Engine: MSHTML v8.0, Chakra
- Operating system: Windows 7 SP1; Windows Server 2008 R2 SP1; Windows Embedded 8 Standard; Windows Server 2012
- Platform: IA-32, x64, and ARM
- Included with: Windows 8.1; Windows RT; Windows Server 2012 R2; Windows 10; Windows Server 2016; Windows Server 2019; Windows Server 2022
- Predecessor: Internet Explorer 10 (2012)
- Successor: Microsoft Edge Legacy (2015)
- Size: 28–53 MB
- License: Proprietary, requires a Windows license
- Website: Internet Explorer 11 (archived at Wayback Machine)

Internet Explorer 11 (IE11) is the eleventh and final version of the Internet Explorer web browser. It was initially included in the release of Windows 8.1, Windows RT 8.1 and Windows Server 2012 R2 on October 17, 2013, and was later released for Windows 7 and Windows Server 2008 R2 on November 7, 2013. It is the successor to Internet Explorer 10, released the previous year, and was the original default browser in Windows 8.1 and Windows Server 2012 R2. It is also included in the release of Windows 10, Windows Server 2016 and Windows Server 2019. On April 16, 2019, it was made available to Windows Server 2012 and Windows Embedded 8 Standard as the final expansion of Internet Explorer 11 availability.

Microsoft adjusted their product lifecycle policies to only support the most recent version of Internet Explorer offered for any given version of Windows on January 12, 2016, and later expanded to Windows Server 2012 and Windows Embedded 8 Standard on January 31, 2020. Support for Internet Explorer 11, now regarded as an "OS component", is bound to the version of the Windows it is installed on. Thus, Microsoft provides updates only to currently supported versions of Windows. This includes Windows 10 LTSC (formerly LTSB), and supported Windows Server versions, which will continue to receive IE11 updates until their respective end-of-support dates. The exception to this is the Windows 10 Semi-Annual Channel (SAC). For SAC versions of Windows 10, Internet Explorer 11 support ended on June 15, 2022, and it was permanently disabled on February 14, 2023. Any remaining icons or shortcuts were due to be removed on June 13, 2023, however, on May 19, 2023, various organizations disapproved, leading Microsoft to withdraw the change. Furthermore, despite Microsoft's alleged permanent IE11 disablement, IE11 can still be accessed in some capacity using unofficial methods.

IE Mode, a feature of Microsoft Edge, enables Edge to display web pages using Internet Explorer 11's Trident layout engine and other core components. Through IE Mode, the underlying technology of Internet Explorer 11 partially exists on Windows that do not support Internet Explorer as a proper application, such as Windows 11 and later versions that derive from the Windows 11 codebase. Microsoft has announced support for IE Mode through at least 2029, with a one-year advance notice before retiring this variant of IE11.

Internet Explorer 11 is retired and out of support. On most editions, such as Home and Pro, the desktop browser has been disabled and replaced by Microsoft Edge (with paid ESU exceptions until 2028). Some editions are exceptions, notably the Windows 10 China Government Edition. However, IE mode in Microsoft Edge remains, meaning IE 11's rendering engine will be supported through at least 2029 and retired only after a year's notice. The last edition with IE 11 support is Windows 10 IoT Enterprise LTSC 2021 (for specialized devices such as medical equipment controllers and ATMs), supported until January 13, 2032, which marked the end of all support for Internet Explorer 11 and also the Internet Explorer family.

== Changes ==
Screenshot of the Internet Explorer 11 Enhanced Security Configuration page

IE11 features redesigned developer tools, support for WebGL, enhanced scaling for high DPI screens, prerender and prefetch. After launch IE11 got support for HTTP/2. In addition, IE11 supports Full Screen and Orientation APIs, CSS border image support, JavaScript enhancements, DOM mutation observers, Web Cryptography API, video text track support, encrypted media support and an improved HTML editor. IE11 uses Transport Layer Security v1.2 as the default protocol for secure connections and deprecates RC4 cipher suite.

The "document mode" feature in the developer toolset (F12) allows simulating the rendering behaviour of Internet Explorer versions 5 to 10 to facilitate testing pages for compatibility.

Internet Explorer 11 for Windows RT does not support Java and other add-ons.

=== Removed features ===
- IE11 has deprecated document.all, meaning that code that checks for its presence will not detect it, but code that actually uses it will continue to work. Additionally, the attachEvent proprietary API has been removed.
- Quick Tabs (Ctrl+Q)
- Work Offline command removed from File menu
- Drag and drop of selected content from IE to other programs like Word or WordPad
- Use large icons for command buttons
- Some Group Policy settings are no longer supported.
- Ability to view all cookies at once via Developer Tools
- Ability to disable tabbed browsing
- autocomplete="off" for input type="password"

=== Added features ===
- KB3058515 released on June 9, 2015, added HTTP Strict Transport Security support to IE 11.
- KB3139929 bundles a patch which adds advertising of a Windows 10 upgrade offer to the new tab page.

== Performance ==
In a November 2013 review by SitePoint, IE11 scored better than Google Chrome 30 and Firefox 26 in WebKit's SunSpider test and Google's WebGL test. It tied with Chrome for fastest in Microsoft's "fish aquarium" benchmark for WebGL and came last in Google's V8 performance benchmark. As a result of the speed improvements, the reviewer said "if you switched to Chrome for speed alone, you're now using the wrong browser." IE11 was also observed to use less memory with multiple tabs open than contemporary versions of Chrome and Firefox.

In August 2015, SitePoint again benchmarked IE11 in its review for Microsoft Edge [Legacy], where Edge 12, Chrome 44 and Firefox 39 were also present. IE11 came last in Apple's JetStream test (which replaced SunSpider) and Google's Octane test (which replaces V8) but it came second in Microsoft's "fish aquarium" test, after Edge.

== History ==
Though an internal build of IE11 was leaked on March 25, 2013, its first preview version was not formally released until June 2013, during the Build 2013 conference, along with the preview release of Windows Server 2012 R2 and Windows 8.1. On July 25, 2013, Microsoft released the developer preview of Internet Explorer 11 for Windows 7 and Windows Server 2008 R2.

Unsupported
Latest version
Preview version

History of Internet Explorer releases
Name	Version	Release date	Works on	New features
Developer Preview	11.0.9431.0	June 26, 2013	Windows 8.1 Preview	WebGL, CSS border image, improved JavaScript performance, major update to Internet Explorer Developer Tools, hardware-accelerated JPEG decoding, closed captioning, HTML5 full screen, HTML5 prerender, HTML5 prefetch Windows 8.1 only: cryptography (WebCrypto), adaptive bitrate streaming (Media Source Extensions), Encrypted Media Extensions, SPDY v3
Developer Preview	11.0.9431.0	July 25, 2013	Windows 7 and Windows Server 2008 R2	WebGL, CSS border image, improved JavaScript performance, major update to Internet Explorer Developer Tools, hardware-accelerated JPEG decoding, closed captioning, HTML5 full screen, HTML5 prerender, HTML5 prefetch Windows 8.1 only: cryptography (WebCrypto), adaptive bitrate streaming (Media Source Extensions), Encrypted Media Extensions, SPDY v3
Release Preview	11.0.9600.16384	September 17, 2013	Windows 7 and Windows Server 2008 R2	Performance improvements
Internet Explorer 11	11.0.9600.16384	October 17, 2013	Windows 7, Windows 8.1, Windows 10, Windows Server 2016, Windows Server 2019, and Windows Server 2022	Uses the same build number as the Release Preview. Released for Windows 10, where Microsoft Edge is the default browser from Microsoft in this version of Windows. Internet Explorer is set up to run websites, based on legacy HTML technologies, which are not, or improperly, supported in Microsoft Edge.
Internet Explorer 11	11.0.9600.23450	October 13, 2026	Windows Server 2012 R2, Windows Server 2012 and Windows Server 2008 R2 SP1	KB5126773: Cumulative security update for Internet Explorer: October 13, 2026.

While there were no other releases of Internet Explorer, an update for Windows 7 and 8.1 was released on April 2, 2014, which added Enterprise Mode, improved developer tools, improved support for WebGL and ECMAScript 5.1.

With the release of Windows 11, Windows Server Insider Build 22463 and later, Internet Explorer is no longer preinstalled on any new devices (the application that is, while its core component is due to Microsoft's integration of IE in Windows), but users can still launch Internet Explorer from the Control Panel's browser toolbar settings on or via the PowerShell. Microsoft Edge is the only preinstalled browser in the operating system. An Internet Explorer mode is however provided in Microsoft Edge to run legacy websites. On February 14, 2023, Microsoft permanently disabled IE11 on the Windows 10 Semi-Annual Channel (SAC) as part of a Microsoft Edge update released on February 14, 2023. IE11 visual references, such as the IE11 icons on the Start Menu and taskbar, were set to be removed from Windows 10 SAC by the June 2023 Windows security update ("B" release) on June 13, 2023, however this decision has been reverted.

== See also ==
- Usage share of web browsers

Preceded by Internet Explorer 10	Internet Explorer 11; 2013
