= Zeroday Emergency Response Team =

In computer security, the Zeroday Emergency Response Team (ZERT) was a group of volunteer security researchers who produced emergency patches for zero day attack vulnerabilities in proprietary software. They came to public notice in late September 2006 with a patch for that month's Vector Markup Language vulnerability before Microsoft, later producing a patch for older versions of Microsoft Windows which are no longer supported by Microsoft.

The team included several members prominent in antivirus and network security work.

Their manifesto states: "ZERT members work together as a team to release a non-vendor patch when a so-called "0day" (zero-day) exploit appears in the open which poses a serious risk to the public, to the infrastructure of the Internet or both. The purpose of ZERT is not to "crack" products, but rather to "uncrack" them by averting security vulnerabilities in them before they can be widely exploited."

The ZERT website has not been updated since April 2007 and the group is presumed to be inactive.
