= Microsoft Edge Legacy =

Web browser developed by Microsoft (2015–2020)

- Screenshot of Microsoft Edge Legacy, showing the Main Page of the English Wikipedia
- Developer: Microsoft
- Release: July 29, 2015; 11 years ago
- Final release: 44.19041 with EdgeHTML 18.19041 / May 27, 2020; 6 years ago
- Engines: EdgeHTML, Chakra
- Operating system: Windows 10 until v2004 Windows 10 Mobile; Xbox System Software November 2015 through August 2021 update
- Included with: Windows 10 until v2004 Windows 10 Mobile; Xbox System Software November 2015 through August 2021 update
- Predecessor: Internet Explorer 11 (2013)
- Successor: Microsoft Edge (2020)
- License: Proprietary software; a component of Windows 10
- Website: Microsoft Edge Legacy (archived at Wayback Machine)

Microsoft Edge Legacy (often shortened to Edge Legacy), originally released as simply Microsoft Edge or Edge, is a discontinued proprietary cross-platform web browser created by Microsoft. Released in 2015 along with both Windows 10 and Windows 10 Mobile, it was built with Microsoft's own proprietary browser engine, EdgeHTML, and their Chakra JavaScript engine. It was not released for Windows 8.1 (includes desktop, RT, and phone), Windows Server 2012 R2, and versions released before them.

Microsoft Edge Legacy on desktop was superseded by "The New Microsoft Edge", also known as simply "New Edge" (based on the Chromium open-source project), on January 15, 2020. On Xbox consoles, it was superseded in September 23, 2021.

The end of Edge Legacy support on Windows 10 Mobile coincided with the end of support for that platform, on January 14, 2020, while support on desktop ended on March 9, 2021, ending a 14-month support-transition grace period. Xbox System Software support ended on September 23, 2021, when it was replaced by New Edge.

== Features ==
Microsoft Edge [Legacy] was the default web browser, replacing Internet Explorer 11 and Internet Explorer Mobile. As its development and release is dependent on the model of Windows as a service, it is not included in Windows 10 Long-Term Servicing Branch/Channel (LTSB/LTSC) builds.

Microsoft initially announced that Edge would support the legacy MSHTML (Trident) browser engine for backward compatibility, but later said that, due to "strong feedback", Edge would use a new engine, while Internet Explorer would continue to provide the legacy engine. The developer toolset features an option to emulate the rendering behavior ("document mode") of Internet Explorer versions 5 to 11.

Favorites, reading list, browsing history and downloads are viewed at the Hub, a sidebar providing functionality similar to Internet Explorer's Downloads manager and Favorites Center.

Edge features a built-in PDF reader, and supports WebAssembly. Until January 2021, Edge also featured an integrated Adobe Flash Player (with an internal whitelist allowing Flash applets on Facebook and other websites to load automatically, bypassing all other security controls requiring user activation).

Edge does not support legacy technologies such as ActiveX and Browser Helper Objects; instead, it uses an extension system based on the cross-browser WebExtension API. However, an integrated Flash Player ActiveX control was retained for compatibility.

Edge integrates with Microsoft's online platforms to provide voice control, search functionality, and dynamic information related to searches within the address bar. Users can make annotations to web pages that can be stored to and shared with OneDrive, and can save HTML and MHTML pages to their computers. It also integrates with the "Reading List" function and provides a "Reading Mode" that strips unnecessary formatting from pages to improve their legibility.

When preliminary support for browser extensions was added in March 2016 with build 14291, only three extensions were initially supported. Microsoft indicated that the delay in allowing extensions and the small number was due to security concerns.

=== Release cycle ===
Microsoft Edge Legacy release cadence was tied to the Windows release cycle and used the Windows Insider Program to preview new versions of the browser. These pre-release builds were known as "Edge Preview". Every major new release of Windows 10/10 Mobile included an updated version of Edge Legacy and its render engine until the release of New Edge.

== Development ==
Project Spartan logo, used in Windows 10 builds 10049 to 10137

In December 2014, writing for ZDNet, technology writer Mary Jo Foley reported that Microsoft was developing a new web browser codenamed "Spartan". She said that "Spartan" would be treated as a new product separate from Internet Explorer, with Internet Explorer 11 retained alongside it for compatibility.

In early January 2015, The Verge obtained further details surrounding "Spartan" from sources close to Microsoft, including reports that it would replace Internet Explorer on both the desktop and mobile versions of Windows. Microsoft officially unveiled "Spartan" during a Windows-focused keynote on January 21, 2015. It was described as a separate product from Internet Explorer, although its final name was not announced.

"Spartan" was first made publicly available as the default browser of Windows 10 Technical Preview build 10049, released on March 30, 2015. The new engine used by "Spartan" was available in Windows 10 builds as part of Internet Explorer 11, Microsoft later announced that Internet Explorer would be deprecated on Windows and would not use the "Spartan" engine.

On April 29, 2015, during the Build Conference keynote, it was announced that "Spartan" would officially be known as Microsoft Edge. The browser's logo and branding were designed to maintain continuity with the branding of Internet Explorer. The Project "Spartan" branding was used in versions released after Build 2015. On June 25, 2015, Microsoft released version 19.10149 for Windows 10 Mobile which included the new brand. Version 20.10158 followed on June 28, 2015, for the desktop versions, also including the updated branding. Then on July 15, 2015, Microsoft released version 20.10240 as the final release to Insiders. The same version was rolled out to consumers on July 29, 2015.

On August 12, 2015, Microsoft started the preview program for the next version of Microsoft Edge when they released version 20.10512 to Mobile users. Six days later, version 20.10525 followed for desktop users. These preview versions received multiple updates. On November 5, 2015, Microsoft released version 25.10586 as the final release for Edge's second public release for desktop users. The update was then rolled out to desktop and Xbox users (as part of the New Xbox Experience Update, which was also the initial release of Edge on that platform) on November 12, 2015. Then on November 18, 2015, the update was rolled out to Windows 10 Mobile, also as the initial (stable) release on that platform. Finally, on November 19, 2015, the update was also made available as part of the Windows Server 2016 Technical Preview 4.

In April 2018, Edge added tab audio muting. In June 2018, support for the Web Authentication specifications were added to Windows Insider builds, with support for Windows Hello and external security tokens.

August 2019 saw the removal of Edge support for the EPUB file format.

Microsoft stopped supporting Edge Legacy (for desktop) on March 9, 2021. On April 13, 2021, Microsoft released a cumulative monthly security update which completely removed Edge Legacy and replaced it with the new Chromium-based Edge, if not already present. While the initial release of New Edge on Xbox, as bundled with the September 2021 update, replaced Edge Legacy and marked the end of Xbox System Software support for it.

=== EdgeHTML ===
EdgeHTML is the proprietary browser engine developed for the original Microsoft Edge. It is a fork of MSHTML (Trident) with all legacy code of older versions of Internet Explorer removed, with the majority of its source code rewritten to support web standards and interoperability with other modern browsers. EdgeHTML is written in C++.

The rendering engine was first released as an experimental option in Internet Explorer 11 as part of the Windows 10 Preview 9926 build.

EdgeHTML is meant to be fully compatible with the WebKit layout engine used by Safari and other browsers. Microsoft stated their original acceptance criteria: "Any Edge–WebKit differences are bugs that we're interested in fixing."

A review of the engine in the beta Windows 10 build by AnandTech found substantial benchmark improvements over MSHTML (Trident), particularly its new Chakra JavaScript engine performance, which had come up to par with that of Google Chrome. Other benchmarks focusing on the performance of the WebGL API found EdgeHTML to perform much better than Google Chrome and Mozilla Firefox.

=== Edge Legacy release history ===
Version	Browser engine	Release date(s)	Highlights
20.10240	EdgeHTML 12.10240	July 15, 2015	First public release, initial release for PC: Support for PDFs; Pinnable Hub with Favorites, Download manager, Reading List, and History; New Tab page with MSN news and search bar; Support for inking on webpages; Cortana Integration; Reading View; Dark theme; Performance improvements
25.10586	EdgeHTML 13.10586	November 5, 2015	Initial release on Windows 10 Mobile and Xbox System Software: Improved render engine with Pointer Lock support, canvas blending modes, asm.js support by default, and more; Object RTC API; Improved tab management; Tabs can now be previewed by hovering over them; Reading list items and favorites are now synced; Updated Settings pane; Hub options are now available in the ellipses menu; Media Casting; Cortana Integration with PDFs
38.14393	EdgeHTML 14.14393	August 2, 2016	Initial release on Windows Holographic: Experimental support for VP9; Context menu for navigation buttons; Improved favorites management; Improved download management; Pinned tab support added; Ability to copy and paste links in Microsoft Edge added; Download reminders; Default save locations can be changed; Favorite Tree View improvements; Experimental JavaScript ES6 Regex symbols support; New Web Platform features; Improved F12 developer tools; Improved accessibility; Swipe gestures to navigate back and forward; Support for Beacon, Web Notifications, and Fetch API; Official support for browser extensions; WOFF 2 fonts; Support for Color Fonts formats (sbix, OpenType-SVG, COLR/CPAL, CBDT/CBLC)
40.15063	EdgeHTML 15.15063	April 11, 2017	Added CTRL + O keyboard shortcut to set focus to the address bar; Partial implementation of Webkit-Text-Stroke and CSS outline-offset; Ability to use Snooze to put a website in a Cortana Reminder to make it show up in the Action Center; Ability to import and export favorites from and to a file; Improved ES6 Modules debugging in F12 Developer Tools; H.264/AVC became enabled by default for RTC; Support for WebRTC 1.0 and Service Workers (behind flags); Added support for the EPUB file format; The "Snooze" feature has been removed; Icons of pages in the hub became larger; Console filter settings will persist for buttons and context menu; Support for the Brotli compressed data format as an HTTP content-encoding method; Updated the MS-prefixed FIDO 2.0 implementation to match the latest W3C Web Authentication specification; Partial support for CSS Custom Properties (aka CSS Variables); Preliminary support for the IntersectionObserver API; Async/await is enabled by default; DOM performance improvements; Advanced Tab Management; Added support for EPUB/PDF read aloud
40.15254.603	EdgeHTML 15.15254	January 14, 2020	Final release on Windows 10 Mobile
41.16299	EdgeHTML 16.16299	September 26, 2017	WebAssembly now enabled by default
42.17134	EdgeHTML 17.17134	April 30, 2018	Support for Progressive Web Apps; CSS transforms on SVG elements; Support for Notification API
44.17763	EdgeHTML 18.17763	November 13, 2018	Support for Autoplay Policies; CSS masking, overflow-wrap, and overscroll-behavior support; Improvements to Developer Tools; WebP image format support; Web Authentication API support; High-quality kerning pairs and ligatures; Promise.prototype.finally support; Remove support for EPUB e-books
44.18362	EdgeHTML 18.18362	May 21, 2019	Support for Autoplay Policies; CSS masking, overflow-wrap, and overscroll-behavior support; Improvements to Developer Tools; WebP image format support; Web Authentication API support; High-quality kerning pairs and ligatures; Promise.prototype.finally support; Remove support for EPUB e-books
44.18363	EdgeHTML 18.18363	November 12, 2019	Support for Autoplay Policies; CSS masking, overflow-wrap, and overscroll-behavior support; Improvements to Developer Tools; WebP image format support; Web Authentication API support; High-quality kerning pairs and ligatures; Promise.prototype.finally support; Remove support for EPUB e-books
44.19041	EdgeHTML 18.19041	May 27, 2020	Support for Autoplay Policies; CSS masking, overflow-wrap, and overscroll-behavior support; Improvements to Developer Tools; WebP image format support; Web Authentication API support; High-quality kerning pairs and ligatures; Promise.prototype.finally support; Remove support for EPUB e-books

== Performance ==
Early benchmarks of the EdgeHTML engine—included in the first beta release of Edge in Windows 10 Build 10049—had drastically better JavaScript performance due to the new Chakra JavaScript engine being used instead of the older Chakra JScript engine in Internet Explorer 11, with similar performance to Google Chrome 41 and Mozilla Firefox 37. In the SunSpider benchmark, Edge performed faster than other browsers, while in other benchmarks it operated slower than Google Chrome, Mozilla Firefox and Opera.

Later benchmarks conducted with the version included in 10122 showed significant performance improvement compared to both IE11 and Edge back in 10049. According to Microsoft's benchmark result, this iteration of Edge performed better than both Chrome and Firefox in Google's Octane 2.0 and Apple's Jetstream benchmark.

Edge originally lacked support for open media standards such as WebM and Opus, but these were later added in Edge 14.14291.

In July 2015, Edge scored 377 out of 555 points on the HTML5test. Chrome 44 and Firefox 42 scored 479 and 434 respectively, while Internet Explorer 11 scored 312.

In August 2015, Microsoft released Windows 10 Build 10532 to insiders, which included Edge 21.10532.0. This beta version scored 445 out of 555 points on the HTML5test.

In July 2016, with the release of Windows 10 Build 14390 to insiders, the HTML5 test score of the browser's development version was 460 out of 555 points. Chrome 51 scored 497, Firefox 47 scored 456, and Safari 9.1 scored 370.

In June 2017, Edge 17 had scored 492/555 on HTML5test.

=== Power efficiency ===
In June 2016, Microsoft published benchmark results to prove the superior power efficiency of Edge in comparison to all other major web browsers. Opera questioned the accuracy and provided their own test results where Opera came out on top. Independent testing by PC World confirmed Microsoft's results. However, tests conducted by Linus Sebastian in June 2017 instead showed that, at that time, Chrome had the best battery performance.

== Reception ==
In an August 2015 review of Windows 10 by Dan Grabham of TechRadar, Microsoft Edge was praised for its performance, despite not being in a feature-complete state at launch. Peter Bright of Ars Technica praised the browser for being "tremendously promising" and "a much better browser than Internet Explorer ever was" but criticized it for its lack of functionality on launch. Thom Holwerda of OSNews criticized Edge in August 2015 for its hidden URL bar, lack of user-friendliness, poor design, and a tab system that is "so utterly broken it should never have shipped in a final release". He described the browser's implemented features as "some sort of cosmic joke", saying that "infuriating doesn't even begin to describe it".

Data from August 2015, a few weeks after release, showed that user uptake of Edge was low, with only 2% of overall computer users using the new browser. Among Windows 10 users, usage peaked at 20% and then dropped to 14% through August 2015.

In October 2015, a security researcher published a report outlining a bug in Edge's "InPrivate" mode, causing data related to visited sites to still be cached in the user's profile directory, theoretically making it possible for others to determine sites visited. The bug gained mainstream attention in early February 2016, and was fixed with a cumulative update on February 9, 2016.

=== Market share ===
According to StatCounter, in August 2019, Edge overtook the market share of Internet Explorer on PCs, ranking third place at 9.14% and IE in sixth. On Xbox, Edge replaced IE as the dominant browser shortly after its release in November 2015.
