= Index.dat =

Web browser database file on Windows

In the Microsoft Windows operating system, index.dat is a hidden database file used by the Internet Explorer web browser. It functions as an information storage database of recent browser activity, enabling quick access to that information when needed again by Internet Explorer, thus improving browser performance.

== Function ==
The index.dat file is a database file. It is a repository of information such as web URLs, search queries and recently opened files. Its purpose is to enable quick access to data used by Internet Explorer. For example, every web address visited is stored in the index.dat file, allowing Internet Explorer to quickly find Autocomplete matches as the user types a web address. The index.dat file is user-specific and is open as long as a user is logged into his or her Windows user account. Separate index.dat files exist for the Internet Explorer history, cache, and cookies.

The index.dat file is never resized or deleted. A large index.dat file can impair performance.

Note: The .dat extension is commonly used for data files (files that are not human-readable and do not hold a document-based binary file). It's possible to find files named 'index.dat' that are not used by Internet Explorer.

== Controversy ==
Internet privacy groups say that the use of index.dat files in the Windows operating system is an invasion of users' privacy. The information contained in an index.dat file can be considered private to the user. One of the groups' main complaints is that the index.dat files cannot easily be deleted. This is because windows prevents open or "locked" files from being deleted.

It has been contended that the method provided by the Windows operating system for removing information from the index.dat files gives a false sense of security. Although the internet cache directory can be cleared, its use cannot be disabled. Also, removing individual entries from an index.dat file (for example, by using Windows Explorer) only prevents those entries being used; it does not remove the files referenced until the next "cleanup". (Marking single entries as deleted rather than erasing them is a common database method of quickly removing items from use whilst also retaining those items should it be desirable to reverse the deletion.)

While employees of Microsoft have claimed that the Windows operating system deliberately hides index.dat files, users of the Microsoft system point to the fact that Windows Explorer offers users a detailed view of the content of the files when browsing containing directories, therefore allowing anybody using the system to look at and even change and remove their Internet data.

Some spyware target the index.dat file for unauthorized reading and/or editing. Computer forensics commonly look at index.dat as part of their analysis of computer use.

== Removal tools ==
Various free programs (among them Red Button, CCleaner, and Index.dat Suite), can completely remove index.dat files until they are recreated by Windows, though CCleaner, and perhaps the others, does not delete the hidden index.dat file in the Temporary Internet Files directory, which contains a copy of the cookies that were in the Cookies directory. However, if Secure Deletion is enabled in CCleaner then this will effectively wipe the contents of this file although the size will continue to increase with use.

== Supported on ==
Index.dat is only available up to Internet Explorer 9. Internet Explorer 10 and 11 do not have index.dat files. Instead, Internet Explorer 10 and 11 use WebCacheV01.dat.
