= Chakra (JScript engine) =

JScript engine of Internet Explorer

- Developer: Microsoft
- Release: 2009; 17 years ago
- Written in: C++
- Operating system: Microsoft Windows
- Type: JScript engine
- License: Proprietary

Chakra is a JScript engine used in the Internet Explorer web browser, both developed by Microsoft as proprietary software.

Microsoft later developed a new JavaScript engine for its Microsoft Edge Legacy browser, which shares the same name as its predecessor. Microsoft Edge changed to V8 in 2020 when it became a Chromium-based browser.

== Features ==
A distinctive feature of the engine is that it just-in-time (JIT) compiles scripts on a separate central processing unit (CPU) core, parallel to the web browser. Though Microsoft has in the past pointed out that other elements, such as rendering and marshalling, are just as important for a browser's overall performance, their improvements to the engine were in response to evolving competing browsers, compared to which IE8 was lagging behind in terms of client-side script processing speed.

== History ==
SunSpider tests performed on November 18, 2009 showed the Professional Developers Conference (PDC) version of IE9 executing scripts much faster than IE8, but slower than Firefox 3.6, Chrome 4, and WebKit Nightly. The same test performed on March 15, 2010 showed the first IE9 Platform Preview (using the then-current version of Chakra) to be faster than Firefox (with SpiderMonkey), but slower than Safari (with SquirrelFish Extreme), Chrome (with V8), and Opera (with Carakan).

On March 8, 2011, Microsoft published results showing the 32-bit Internet Explorer 9 to be faster than Safari, Firefox (with TraceMonkey), Chrome, and Opera.

March 2011 performance tests for ZDNET concluded that Internet Explorer 9 (32-bit), Chrome 10, and Firefox 4 release candidate were "pretty evenly matched."

In 2012, subsequent versions of Chakra, such as the version included in Internet Explorer 10, introduced additional performance changes, including JIT compiling on x86-64 and ARM architectures, and optimizations related to floating point math and garbage collection.
