= Internet Explorer =

Web browser by Microsoft

- Logo used since 2011

- Screenshot of Internet Explorer 11, showing the Main Page of the English Wikipedia
- Other names: Microsoft Internet Explorer (versions 1–6); Windows Internet Explorer (versions 7–9); IE
- Original author: Thomas Reardon
- Developer: Microsoft
- Release: August 24, 1995; 31 years ago (included with Plus! for Windows 95)
- Engines: MSHTML (Trident), Chakra
- Operating system: Windows (previously supported: Mac OS X, Solaris, HP-UX)
- Platform: IA-32, x86-64, ARMv7 (previously supported: MIPS, Alpha, PowerPC, 68k, SPARC, PA-RISC, Itanium)
- Included with: Microsoft Plus! for Windows 95; Windows 95 OSR1 or later; Windows NT 4.0 through Windows 10 version 21H2; Windows Phone 7 through Windows Phone 8.1; Mac OS 8.1 through Mac OS X 10.2; Zune HD; Xbox 360; Xbox One
- Successor: Microsoft Edge
- Standards: HTML5, CSS3, WOFF, SVG, RSS, Atom, JPEG XR
- Available in: 95 languages
- Type: Web browser; Feed reader
- License: Proprietary, requires a Windows license
- Website: microsoft.com/ie

Internet Explorer (Note: Since versions 10–11) (formerly Microsoft Internet Explorer (Note: In versions 1–6) and Windows Internet Explorer, (Note: In versions 7–9) commonly abbreviated as IE or MSIE) is a retired series of graphical web browsers developed by Microsoft that were used in the Windows line of operating systems. While IE has been discontinued on most Windows editions, it remains supported on certain editions of Windows, such as Windows 10 LTSB/LTSC. Starting in 1995, it was first released as part of the add-on package Plus! for Windows 95 that year. Later versions were available as free downloads or in-service packs and included in the original equipment manufacturer (OEM) service releases of Windows 95 and later versions of Windows. Microsoft spent over US$100 million per year on Internet Explorer in the late 1990s, with over 1,000 people involved in the project by 1999. In 2015, Microsoft Edge was released to succeed Internet Explorer 11 as Microsoft's primary web browser. New feature development for Internet Explorer was discontinued the following year, and support for the browser officially ended on June 15, 2022, for Windows 10 Semi-Annual Channel (SAC) editions.

Although Internet Explorer has fallen out of general use after retirement, it was once the most widely used web browser, attaining a peak of 95% usage share by 2003. This came after Microsoft used bundling to win the first browser war against Netscape, which was the dominant browser in the 1990s. Its usage share declined with the launches of Firefox (2004) and Google Chrome (2008) and with the growing popularity of mobile operating systems such as Android and iOS that do not support Internet Explorer. Microsoft Edge, IE's successor, first overtook Internet Explorer in terms of market share in November 2019. Versions of Internet Explorer for other operating systems were also produced, including an Xbox 360 version called Internet Explorer for Xbox and for platforms Microsoft no longer supports: Internet Explorer for Mac and Internet Explorer for UNIX (Solaris and HP-UX), and an embedded OEM version called Pocket Internet Explorer, later rebranded Internet Explorer Mobile, made for Windows CE, Windows Phone, and, previously, based on Internet Explorer 7, for Windows Phone 7.

The browser was scrutinized throughout its development for its use of third-party technology (such as the source code of Spyglass Mosaic, used without royalty in early versions) and security and privacy vulnerabilities, and the United States and the European Union have determined that the integration of Internet Explorer with Windows has been to the detriment of fair browser competition.

The core of Internet Explorer 11 will continue being shipped and supported until at least 2029 as IE Mode, a feature of Microsoft Edge, enabling Edge to display web pages using Internet Explorer 11's Trident layout engine and other components. Through IE Mode, the underlying technology of Internet Explorer 11 partially exists on versions of Windows that do not support IE11 as a proper application, including newer versions of Windows 10, as well as Windows 11, Windows Server 2022 and Windows Server 2025.

== History ==
=== Internet Explorer 1 ===
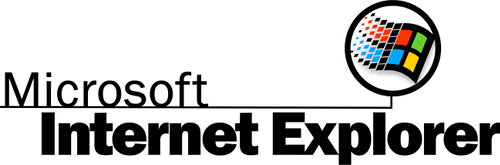
Logo for Internet Explorer 2

The Internet Explorer project was started in the summer of 1994 by Thomas Reardon, who, according to former project lead Ben Slivka, used source code from Spyglass, Inc. Mosaic, which was an early commercial web browser with formal ties to the pioneering National Center for Supercomputing Applications (NCSA) Mosaic browser. In late 1994, Microsoft licensed Spyglass Mosaic for a quarterly fee plus a percentage of Microsoft's non-Windows revenues for the software. Although bearing a name similar to NCSA Mosaic, Spyglass Mosaic had used the NCSA Mosaic source code sparingly.

The first version, was installed as part of the Internet Jumpstart Kit in the Microsoft Plus! pack for Windows 95. The Internet Explorer team began with about six people in early development. Internet Explorer 1.5 was released several months later for Windows NT and added support for basic table rendering. By including it free of charge with their operating system, they did not have to pay royalties to Spyglass Inc, resulting in a lawsuit and a US$8 million settlement on January 22, 1997.

Microsoft was sued by SyNet Inc. in 1996, for trademark infringement, claiming it owned the rights to the name "Internet Explorer". It ended with Microsoft paying $5 million to settle the lawsuit.

=== Internet Explorer 2 ===
Internet Explorer 2 is the second major version of Internet Explorer, released on November 28, 1995 for Windows 95 and Windows NT and on April 23, 1996 for Apple Macintosh and Windows 3.1.

=== Internet Explorer 3 ===
Internet Explorer 3 is the third major version of Internet Explorer, released on August 13, 1996 for Microsoft Windows and on January 8, 1997 for Apple Mac OS.

=== Internet Explorer 4 ===
Internet Explorer 4 is the fourth major version of Internet Explorer, released on September 22, 1997 for Microsoft Windows, Mac OS, Solaris, and HP-UX. It was the first version of Internet Explorer to use the Trident web engine.

=== Internet Explorer 5 ===
Internet Explorer 5 is the fifth major version of Internet Explorer, released on March 18, 1999 for Microsoft Windows, Mac OS X (up to v5.2.3), Classic Mac OS (up to v5.1.7), Solaris and HP-UX (up to 5.01 SP1).

=== Internet Explorer 6 ===
Internet Explorer 6 is the sixth major version of Internet Explorer, released on August 24, 2001 for Windows NT 4.0 SP6a, Windows 98, Windows 2000, Windows ME and as the default web browser for Windows XP and Windows Server 2003.

=== Internet Explorer 7 ===
Internet Explorer 7 is the seventh major version of Internet Explorer, released on October 18, 2006 for Windows XP SP2+, Windows Server 2003 SP1+ and as the default web browser for Windows Vista, Windows Server 2008 and Windows Embedded POSReady 2009. IE7 introduces tabbed browsing.

=== Internet Explorer 8 ===
Internet Explorer 8 is the eighth major version of Internet Explorer, released on March 19, 2009 for Windows XP SP2+, Windows Server 2003 SP2, Windows Vista, Windows Server 2008 and as the default web browser for Windows 7 and Windows Server 2008 R2.

=== Internet Explorer 9 ===
Internet Explorer 9 is the ninth major version of Internet Explorer, released on March 14, 2011 for Windows Vista SP2, Windows Server 2008 SP2, Windows7 and Windows Server 2008 R2.

=== Internet Explorer 10 ===
Internet Explorer 10 is the tenth major version of Internet Explorer, released on October 26, 2012, and is the default web browser for Windows 8 and Windows Server 2012. It became available for Windows 7 SP1 and Windows Server 2008 R2 SP1 on February 26, 2013.

=== Internet Explorer 11 ===
Internet Explorer 11 is featured in Windows 8.1, Windows Server 2012 R2 and Windows RT 8.1, which was released on October 17, 2013. It includes an incomplete mechanism for syncing tabs. It is a major update to its developer tools, enhanced scaling for high DPI screens, HTML5 prerender and prefetch, hardware-accelerated JPEG decoding, closed captioning, HTML5 full screen, and is the first Internet Explorer to support WebGL and Google's protocol SPDY (starting at v3). This version of IE has features dedicated to Windows 8.1, including cryptography (WebCrypto), adaptive bitrate streaming (Media Source Extensions) and Encrypted Media Extensions.

Internet Explorer 11 was made available for Windows 7 users to download on November 7, 2013, with Automatic Updates in the following weeks.

Internet Explorer 11's user agent string now identifies the agent as "Trident" (the underlying browser engine) instead of "MSIE". It also announces compatibility with Gecko (the browser engine of Firefox).

Microsoft claimed that Internet Explorer 11, running the WebKit SunSpider JavaScript Benchmark, was the fastest browser as of October 15, 2013.

Internet Explorer 11 was made available for Windows Server 2012 and Windows Embedded 8 Standard in April 2019.

=== End of life ===
Microsoft Edge [Legacy] was officially unveiled on January 21, 2015, as "Project Spartan". On April 29, 2015, Microsoft announced that Microsoft Edge would replace Internet Explorer as the default browser in Windows 10. However, Internet Explorer remained the default web browser on the Windows 10 Long Term Servicing Channel (LTSC) and on Windows Server until 2021, primarily for enterprise purposes.

Internet Explorer is still installed in Windows 10 to maintain compatibility with older websites and intranet sites that require ActiveX and other legacy web technologies. The browser's MSHTML rendering engine also remains for compatibility reasons.

Additionally, Microsoft Edge shipped with the "Internet Explorer mode" feature, which enables support for legacy internet applications. This is possible through use of the Trident MSHTML engine, the rendering code of Internet Explorer. Microsoft has committed to supporting Internet Explorer mode at least through 2029, with a one-year notice before it is discontinued.

With the release of Microsoft Edge [Legacy], the development of new features for Internet Explorer ceased. Internet Explorer 11 was the final release, and Microsoft began the process of deprecating Internet Explorer. During this process, it will still be maintained as part of Microsoft's support policies.

Since January 12, 2016, only the latest version of Internet Explorer available for each version of Windows has been supported. At the time, nearly half of Internet Explorer users were using an unsupported version.

In February 2019, Microsoft Chief of Security Chris Jackson recommended that users stop using Internet Explorer as their default browser.

Various websites have dropped support for Internet Explorer. On June 1, 2020, the Internet Archive removed Internet Explorer from its list of supported browsers, due to the browser's dated nature. Since November 30, 2020, the web version of Microsoft Teams can no longer be accessed using Internet Explorer 11, followed by the remaining Microsoft 365 applications since August 17, 2021. WordPress also dropped support for the browser in July 2021.

Microsoft disabled the normal means of launching Internet Explorer in Windows 11 and later versions of Windows 10, but it is still possible for users to launch the browser from the Control Panel's browser toolbar settings or via PowerShell.

On June 15, 2022, Internet Explorer 11 support ended for the Windows 10 Semi-Annual Channel (SAC). Users on these versions of Windows 10 were redirected to Microsoft Edge starting on February 14, 2023, and visual references to the browser (such as icons on the taskbar) would have been removed on June 13, 2023. However, on May 19, 2023, various organizations disapproved, leading Microsoft to withdraw the change. Other versions of Windows that were still supported at the time were unaffected. Specifically, Windows 7 ESU, Windows 8.x, Windows RT; Windows Server 2008/R2 ESU, Windows Server 2012/R2 and later; and Windows 10 LTSB/LTSC continued to receive updates until their respective end of life dates.

On other versions of Windows, Internet Explorer will still be supported until their own end of support dates. IE7 was supported until October 10, 2023, alongside the end of support for Windows Embedded Compact 2013, while IE9 was supported until January 13, 2026, alongside the end of [paid and grandfathered] Premium Assurance support for customers on Windows Server 2008. Barring additional changes to the support policy, Internet Explorer 11 will be supported until January 13, 2032, concurrent with the end of support for Windows 10 IoT Enterprise LTSC 2021.

== Features ==
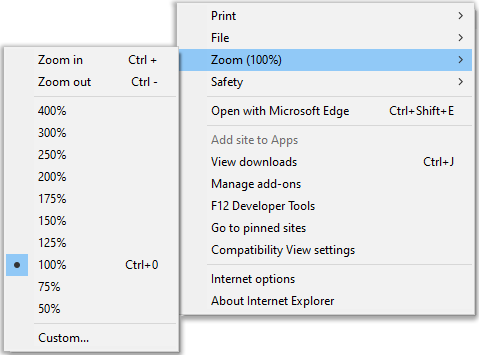
Page zoom as seen in IE11. The lowest allowed manual zoom level is 10%, and the highest 1000%.

Internet Explorer has been designed to view a broad range of web pages and provide certain features within the operating system, including Microsoft Update. During the height of the browser wars, Internet Explorer superseded Netscape only when it caught up technologically to support the progressive features of the time.

=== Standards support ===
Internet Explorer, using the MSHTML (Trident) browser engine:

- Supports HTML 4.01, parts of HTML5, CSS Level 1, Level 2, and Level 3, XML 1.0, and DOM Level 1, with minor implementation gaps.
- Fully supports XSLT 1.0 as well as an obsolete Microsoft dialect of XSLT often referred to as WD-xsl, which was loosely based on the December 1998 W3C Working Draft of XSL. Support for XSLT 2.0 lies in the future: semi-official Microsoft bloggers have indicated that development is underway, but no dates have been announced.
- Almost full conformance to CSS 2.1 has been added in the Internet Explorer 8 release. The MSHTML browser engine in Internet Explorer 9 in 2011, scored highest in the official W3C conformance test suite for CSS 2.1 of all major browsers.
- Supports XHTML in Internet Explorer 9 (MSHTML Trident version 5.0). Prior versions can render XHTML documents authored with HTML compatibility principles and served with a text/html MIME-type.
- Supports a subset of SVG in Internet Explorer 9 (MSHTML Trident version 5.0), excluding SMIL, SVG fonts and filters.

Internet Explorer uses DOCTYPE sniffing to choose between standards mode and a "quirks mode" in which it deliberately mimics nonstandard behaviors of old versions of MSIE for HTML and CSS rendering on screen (Internet Explorer always uses standards mode for printing). It also provides its own dialect of ECMAScript called JScript.

Internet Explorer was criticized by Tim Berners-Lee for its limited support for SVG, which is promoted by W3C.

=== Non-standard extensions ===
Internet Explorer has introduced an array of proprietary extensions to many of the standards, including HTML, CSS, and the DOM. This has resulted in several web pages that appear broken in standards-compliant web browsers and has introduced the need for a "quirks mode" to allow for rendering improper elements meant for Internet Explorer in these other browsers.

Internet Explorer has introduced several extensions to the DOM that have been adopted by other browsers.

These include the inner HTML property, which provides access to the HTML string within an element, which was part of IE 5 and was standardized as part of HTML 5 roughly 15 years later after all other browsers implemented it for compatibility, the XMLHttpRequest object, which allows the sending of HTTP request and receiving of HTTP response, and may be used to perform AJAX, and the designMode attribute of the content Document object, which enables rich text editing of HTML documents. Some of these functionalities were not possible until the introduction of the W3C DOM methods. Its Ruby character extension to HTML is also accepted as a module in W3C XHTML 1.1, though it is not found in all versions of W3C HTML.

Microsoft submitted several other features of IE for consideration by the W3C for standardization. These include the 'behavior' CSS property, which connects the HTML elements with JScript behaviors (known as HTML Components, HTC), HTML+TIME profile, which adds timing and media synchronization support to HTML documents (similar to the W3C XHTML+SMIL), and the VML vector graphics file format. However, all were rejected, at least in their original forms; VML was subsequently combined with PGML (proposed by Adobe and Sun), resulting in the W3C-approved SVG format, one of the few vector image formats being used on the web, which IE did not support until version 9.

Other non-standard behaviors include: support for vertical text, but in a syntax different from W3C CSS3 candidate recommendation, support for a variety of image effects and page transitions, which are not found in W3C CSS, support for obfuscated script code, in particular JScript.Encode, as well as support for embedding EOT fonts in web pages.

=== Favicon ===
Support for favicons was first added in Internet Explorer 5. Internet Explorer supports favicons in PNG, static GIF and native Windows icon formats. In Windows Vista and later, Internet Explorer can display native Windows icons that have embedded PNG files.

=== Usability and accessibility ===
Internet Explorer makes use of the accessibility framework provided in Windows. Internet Explorer is also a user interface for FTP, with operations similar to Windows Explorer. Internet Explorer 5 and 6 had a side bar for web searches, enabling jumps through pages from results listed in the side bar. Pop-up blocking and tabbed browsing were added respectively in Internet Explorer 6 and Internet Explorer 7. Tabbed browsing can also be added to older versions by installing MSN Search Toolbar or Yahoo Toolbar.

=== Cache ===
Internet Explorer caches visited content in the Temporary Internet Files folder to allow quicker access (or offline access) to previously visited pages. The content is indexed in a database file, known as Index.dat. Multiple Index.dat files exist which index different content—visited content, web feeds, visited URLs, cookies, etc.

Prior to IE7, clearing the cache used to clear the index but the files themselves were not reliably removed, posing a potential security and privacy risk. In IE7 and later, when the cache is cleared, the cache files are more reliably removed, and the index.dat file is overwritten with null bytes.

Caching has been improved in IE9.

=== Group Policy ===
Internet Explorer is fully configurable using Group Policy. Administrators of Windows Server domains (for domain-joined computers) or the local computer can apply and enforce a variety of settings on computers that affect the user interface (such as disabling menu items and individual configuration options), as well as underlying security features such as downloading of files, zone configuration, per-site settings, ActiveX control behavior and others. Policy settings can be configured for each user and for each machine. Internet Explorer also supports Integrated Windows Authentication.

== Architecture ==
The architecture of IE8. Previous versions had a similar architecture, except that both tabs and the UI were within the same process. Consequently, each browser window could have only one "tab process".

Internet Explorer uses a componentized architecture built on the Component Object Model (COM) technology. It consists of several major components, each of which is contained in a separate dynamic-link library (DLL) and exposes a set of COM programming interfaces hosted by the Internet Explorer main executable, iexplore.exe:

- WinInet.dll is the protocol handler for HTTP, HTTPS, and FTP. It handles all network communication over these protocols.
- URLMon.dll is responsible for MIME-type handling and download of web content, and provides a thread-safe wrapper around WinInet.dll and other protocol implementations.
- MSHTML.dll houses the MSHTML (Trident) browser engine introduced in Internet Explorer 4, which is responsible for displaying the pages on-screen and handling the Document Object Model (DOM) of the web pages. MSHTML.dll parses the HTML/CSS file and creates the internal DOM tree representation of it. It also exposes a set of APIs for runtime inspection and modification of the DOM tree. The DOM tree is further processed by a browser engine which then renders the internal representation on screen.
- IEFrame.dll contains the user interface and window of IE in Internet Explorer 7 and above.
- ShDocVw.dll provides the navigation, local caching and history functionalities for the browser.
- BrowseUI.dll is responsible for rendering the browser user interface such as menus and toolbars.

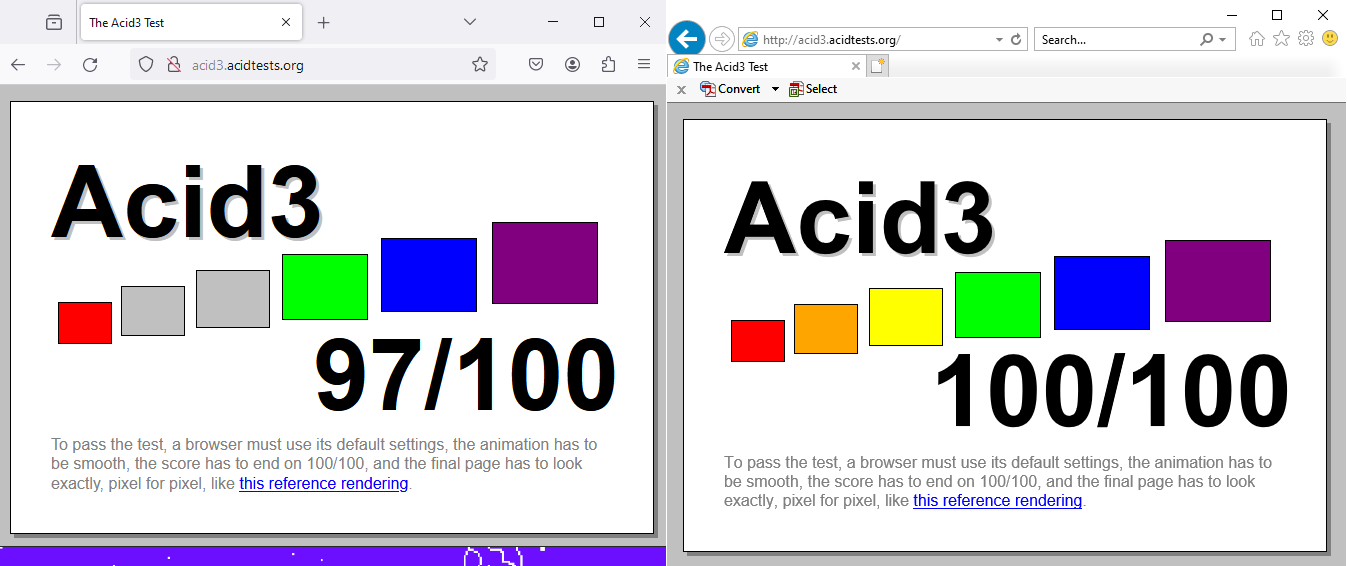
Internet Explorer compared to Firefox on the Acid3 HTML rendering test

Internet Explorer does not include any native scripting functionality. Rather, MSHTML.dll exposes an API that permits a programmer to develop a scripting environment to be plugged-in and to access the DOM tree. Internet Explorer 8 includes the bindings for the Active Scripting engine, which is a part of Microsoft Windows and allows any language implemented as an Active Scripting module to be used for client-side scripting. By default, only the JScript and VBScript modules are provided; third party implementations like ScreamingMonkey (for ECMAScript 4 support) can also be used. Microsoft also makes available the Microsoft Silverlight runtime that allows CLI languages, including DLR-based dynamic languages like IronPython and IronRuby, to be used for client-side scripting.

Internet Explorer 8 introduced some major architectural changes, called loosely coupled IE (LCIE). LCIE separates the main window process (frame process) from the processes hosting the different web applications in different tabs (tab processes). A frame process can create multiple tab processes, each of which can be of a different integrity level, each tab process can host multiple web sites. The processes use asynchronous inter-process communication to synchronize themselves. Generally, there will be a single frame process for all web sites. In Windows Vista with protected mode turned on, however, opening privileged content (such as local HTML pages) will create a new tab process as it will not be constrained by protected mode.

== Extensibility ==
Internet Explorer exposes a set of Component Object Model (COM) interfaces that allows add-ons to extend the functionality of the browser. Extensibility is divided into two types: Browser extensibility and content extensibility. Browser extensibility involves adding context menu entries, toolbars, menu items or Browser Helper Objects (BHO). BHOs are used to extend the feature set of the browser, whereas the other extensibility options are used to expose that feature in the user interface. Content extensibility adds support for non-native content formats. It allows Internet Explorer to handle new file formats and new protocols, e.g. WebM or SPDY. In addition, web pages can integrate widgets known as ActiveX controls which run on Windows only but have vast potentials to extend the content capabilities; Adobe Flash Player and Microsoft Silverlight are examples. Add-ons can be installed either locally, or directly by a website.

Since malicious add-ons can compromise the security of a system, Internet Explorer implements several safeguards. Internet Explorer 6 with Service Pack 2 and later feature an Add-on Manager for enabling or disabling individual add-ons, complemented by a "No Add-Ons" mode. Starting with Windows Vista, Internet Explorer and its BHOs run with restricted privileges and are isolated from the rest of the system. Internet Explorer 9 introduced a new component – Add-on Performance Advisor. Add-on Performance Advisor shows a notification when one or more of installed add-ons exceed a pre-set performance threshold. The notification appears in the Notification Bar when the user launches the browser. Windows 8 and Windows RT introduce a Metro-style version of Internet Explorer that is entirely sandboxed and does not run add-ons at all. In addition, Windows RT cannot download or install ActiveX controls at all; although existing ones bundled with Windows RT still run in the traditional version of Internet Explorer.

Internet Explorer itself can be hosted by other applications via a set of COM interfaces. This can be used to embed the browser functionality inside a computer program or create Internet Explorer shells.

== Security ==
Internet Explorer uses a zone-based security framework that groups sites based on certain conditions, including whether it is an Internet- or intranet-based site as well as a user-editable whitelist. Security restrictions are applied per zone; all the sites in a zone are subject to the restrictions.

Internet Explorer 6 SP2 onwards uses the Attachment Execution Service of Microsoft Windows to mark executable files downloaded from the Internet as being potentially unsafe. Accessing files marked as such will prompt the user to make an explicit trust decision to execute the file, as executables originating from the Internet can be potentially unsafe. This helps in preventing the accidental installation of malware.

Internet Explorer 7 introduced the phishing filter, which restricts access to phishing sites unless the user overrides the decision. With version 8, it also blocks access to sites known to host malware. Downloads are also checked to see if they are known to be malware-infected.

In Windows Vista, Internet Explorer by default runs in what is called Protected Mode, where the privileges of the browser itself are severely restricted—it cannot make any system-wide changes. One can optionally turn this mode off, but this is not recommended. This also effectively restricts the privileges of any add-ons. As a result, even if the browser or any add-on is compromised, the damage the security breach can cause is limited.

Patches and updates to the browser are released periodically and made available through the Windows Update service, as well as through Automatic Updates. Although security patches continue to be released for a range of platforms, most feature additions and security infrastructure improvements are only made available on operating systems that are in Microsoft's mainstream support phase.

On December 16, 2008, Trend Micro recommended users switch to rival browsers until an emergency patch was released to fix a potential security risk which "could allow outside users to take control of a person's computer and steal their passwords." Microsoft representatives countered this recommendation, claiming that "0.02% of internet sites" were affected by the flaw. A fix for the issue was released the following day with the Security Update for Internet Explorer KB960714, on Microsoft Windows Update.

In 2010, Germany's Federal Office for Information Security, known by its German initials, BSI, advised "temporary use of alternative browsers" because of a "critical security hole" in Microsoft's software that could allow hackers to remotely plant and run malicious code on Windows PCs.

In 2011, a report by Accuvant, funded by Google, rated the security (based on sandboxing) of Internet Explorer worse than Google Chrome but better than Mozilla Firefox.

A 2017 browser security white paper comparing Google Chrome, Microsoft Edge [Legacy], and Internet Explorer 11 by X41 D-Sec in 2017 came to similar conclusions, also based on sandboxing and support of legacy web technologies.

=== Security vulnerabilities ===
Internet Explorer has been subjected to many security vulnerabilities and concerns such that the volume of criticism for IE is unusually high. Much of the spyware, adware, and computer viruses across the Internet are made possible by exploitable bugs and flaws in the security architecture of Internet Explorer, sometimes requiring nothing more than viewing of a malicious web page to install themselves. This is known as a "drive-by install". There are also attempts to trick the user into installing malicious software by misrepresenting the software's true purpose in the description section of an ActiveX security alert.

A number of security flaws affecting IE originated not in the browser itself, but in ActiveX-based add-ons used by it. Because the add-ons have the same privilege as IE, the flaws can be as critical as browser flaws. This has led to the ActiveX-based architecture being criticized for being fault-prone. By 2005, some experts maintained that the dangers of ActiveX had been overstated and there were safeguards in place. In 2006, new techniques using automated testing found more than a hundred vulnerabilities in standard Microsoft ActiveX components. Security features introduced in Internet Explorer 7 mitigated some of these vulnerabilities.

In 2008, Internet Explorer had a number of published security vulnerabilities. According to research done by security research firm Secunia, Microsoft did not respond as quickly as its competitors in fixing security holes and making patches available. The firm also reported 366 vulnerabilities in ActiveX controls, an increase from the previous year.

According to an October 2010 report in The Register, researcher Chris Evans had detected a known security vulnerability which, then dating back to 2008, had not been fixed for at least six hundred days. Microsoft says that it had known about this vulnerability, but it was of exceptionally low severity as the victim web site must be configured in a peculiar way for this attack to be feasible at all.

In December 2010, researchers were able to bypass the "Protected Mode" feature in Internet Explorer.

=== Vulnerability exploited in attacks on U.S. firms ===
In an advisory on January 14, 2010, Microsoft said that attackers targeting Google and other U.S. companies used software that exploits a security hole, which had already been patched, in Internet Explorer. The vulnerability affected Internet Explorer 6 on Windows XP and Server 2003, IE6 SP1 on Windows 2000 SP4, IE7 on Windows Vista, XP, Server 2008, and Server 2003, IE8 on Windows 7, Vista, XP, Server 2003, and Server 2008 (R2).

The German government warned users against using Internet Explorer and recommended switching to an alternative web browser, due to the major security hole described above that was exploited in Internet Explorer. The Australian and French governments also issued a similar warning a few days later.

=== Major vulnerability across versions ===
On April 26, 2014, Microsoft issued a security advisory relating to CVE-2014-1776 (use-after-free vulnerability in Internet Explorer 6 through 11), a vulnerability that could allow "remote code execution" in Internet Explorer versions 6 to 11. On April 28, 2014, the United States Department of Homeland Security's United States Computer Emergency Readiness Team (US-CERT) released an advisory stating that the vulnerability could result in "the complete compromise" of an affected system. US-CERT recommended reviewing Microsoft's suggestions to mitigate an attack or using an alternate browser until the bug is fixed. The UK National Computer Emergency Response Team (CERT-UK) published an advisory announcing similar concerns and for users to take the additional step of ensuring their antivirus software is up to date. Symantec, a cyber security firm, confirmed that "the vulnerability crashes Internet Explorer on Windows XP." The vulnerability was resolved on May 1, 2014, with a security update.

== Market adoption and usage share ==
Usage share of web browsers according to StatCounter, 2009–2025

Historical market share of Internet Explorer, 1995–2024

The adoption rate of Internet Explorer seems to be closely related to that of Microsoft Windows, as it is the default web browser that comes with Windows. Since the integration of Internet Explorer 2.0 with Windows 95 OSR 1 in 1996, and especially after version 4.0's release in 1997, the adoption was greatly accelerated: from below 20% in 1996, to about 40% in 1998, and over 80% in 2000. This made Microsoft the winner in the infamous 'first browser war' against Netscape. Netscape Navigator was the dominant browser during 1995 and until 1997, but rapidly lost share to IE starting in 1998, and eventually slipped behind in 1999. The integration of IE with Windows led to a lawsuit by AOL, Netscape's owner, accusing Microsoft of unfair competition. The infamous case was eventually won by AOL but by then it was too late, as Internet Explorer had already become the dominant browser.

Internet Explorer peaked during 2002 and 2003, with about 95% share. Its first notable competitor after beating Netscape was Firefox from Mozilla, which itself was an offshoot from Netscape.

Approximate usage over time based on various usage share counters averaged for the year overall, or for the fourth quarter, or for the last month in the year depending on availability of reference.

Internet Explorer's market share fell below 50% in September 2010. In May 2012, Google Chrome overtook Internet Explorer as the most used browser worldwide, according to StatCounter.

After Google Chrome overtook Internet Explorer, the market share of IE continued to go down reaching 5% in 2020, 2.7% in 2022, the year it got discontinued, about 1.3% in 2023 and in 2025-2026 Internet Explorer only manages to have a market share that keeps changing between 0.2%-0.7%, at the start of 2026 only managing to have 0.4% and now it is estimated that IE has 0.6%-0.7% of the Desktop only Market Share according to StatCounter.

=== Industry adoption ===
Browser Helper Objects are also used by many search engines companies and third parties for creating add-ons that access their services, such as search engine toolbars. Because of the use of COM, it is possible to embed web-browsing functionality in third-party applications. Hence, there are several Internet Explorer shells, and several content-centric applications like RealPlayer also use Internet Explorer's web browsing module for viewing web pages within the applications.

== Removal ==
While a major upgrade of Internet Explorer can be uninstalled in a traditional way if the user has saved the original application files for installation, the matter of uninstalling the version of the browser that has shipped with an operating system remains a controversial one.

The idea of removing a stock install of Internet Explorer from a Windows system was proposed during the United States v. Microsoft Corp. case. One of Microsoft's arguments during the trial was that removing Internet Explorer from Windows may result in system instability. Indeed, programs that depend on libraries installed by IE, including Windows help and support system, fail to function without IE. Before Windows Vista, it was not possible to run Windows Update without IE because the service used ActiveX technology, which no other web browser supports.

== Impersonation by malware ==
The popularity of Internet Explorer led to the appearance of malware abusing its name. On January 28, 2011, a fake Internet Explorer browser calling itself "Internet Explorer – Emergency Mode" appeared. It closely resembled the real Internet Explorer but had fewer buttons, no tabs and no search bar. If a user attempted to launch any other browser such as Google Chrome, Mozilla Firefox, Opera, Safari, or the real Internet Explorer, this browser would be loaded instead. It also displayed a fake error message, claiming that the computer was infected with malware and Internet Explorer had entered "Emergency Mode". It blocked access to legitimate sites such as Google if the user tried to access them.

== See also ==
- Bing Bar
- History of the web browser
- List of web browsers
- Month of bugs
- Web 2.0
- Windows Filtering Platform
- Winsock
