= Usage share =

Usage share may refer to:

- Usage share of BitTorrent clients
- Usage share of instant messaging clients
- Usage share of operating systems
- Usage share of web browsers
- Usage share of web search engines

== See also ==
- Market share
