= Usage share of web browsers =

Relative market adoption of web browsers

Usage share of web browsers in September 2026 according to StatCounter

Yearly usage share of web browsers from 2009 to 2026 according to StatCounter

The usage share of web browsers is the portion, often expressed as a percentage, of visitors to a group of web sites that use a particular web browser. There have been corporate battles to gain market share, and sometime a single browser or browser engine dominates the market. Once a browser drops below a certain market share, web developers may no longer put in effort to support it or ensure compatibility with their websites.

== Accuracy ==
Measuring browser usage in the number of requests (page hits) made by each user agent can be misleading.

=== Overestimation ===
Not all requests are generated by a user, as a user agent can make requests at regular time intervals without user input. In this case, the user's activity might be overestimated. Some examples:

- Certain anti-virus products fake their user agent string to appear to be popular browsers. This is done to trick attack sites that might display clean content to the scanner, but not to the browser. The Register reported in June 2008 that traffic from AVG Linkscanner, using an IE6 user agent string, outstripped human link clicks by nearly 10 to 1.
- A user who revisits a site shortly after changing or upgrading browsers may be double-counted under some methods; overall numbers at the time of a new version's release may be skewed.
- Occasionally websites are written in such a way that they effectively block certain browsers. One common reason for this is that the website has been tested to work with only a limited number of browsers, and so the site owners enforce that only tested browsers are allowed to view the content, while all other browsers are sent a "failure" message, and instruction to use another browser. Many of the untested browsers may still be otherwise capable of rendering the content. Sophisticated users who are aware of this may then "spoof" the user agent string in order to gain access to the site.
- Firefox, Chrome, Safari, and Opera will, under some circumstances, fetch resources before they need to render them, so that the resources can be used faster if they are needed. This technique, prerendering or pre-loading, may inflate the statistics for the browsers using it because of pre-loading of resources which are not used in the end.

=== Underestimation ===
It is also possible to underestimate the usage share by using the number of requests, for example:

- Firefox 1.5 (and other Gecko-based browsers) and later versions use fast Document Object Model (DOM) caching. JavaScript is executed on page load only from net or disk cache, but not if it is loaded from DOM cache. This can affect JavaScript-based tracking of browser statistics.
- While most browsers generate additional page hits by refreshing web pages when the user navigates back through page history, some browsers (such as Opera) reuse cached content without resending requests to the server.
- Generally, the more faithfully a browser implements HTTP's cache specifications, the more it will be under-reported relative to browsers that implement those specifications poorly.
- Browser users may run site, cookie and JavaScript blockers which cause those users to be under-counted. For example, common AdBlock blocklists such as EasyBlock include sites such as StatCounter in their privacy lists, and NoScript blocks all JavaScript by default. The Firefox Add-ons website reports 15.0 million users of AdBlock variants and 2.2 million users of NoScript.
- Users behind a caching proxy (e.g. Squid) may have repeat requests for certain pages served to the browser from the cache, rather than retrieving it again via the Internet.

=== User agent spoofing ===
Websites often include code to detect the browser version to adjust the page design sent according to the user agent string received. This may mean that less popular browsers are not sent complex content (even though they might be able to deal with it correctly) or, in extreme cases, refused all content. Thus, various browsers have a feature to cloak or spoof their identification to force certain server-side content.

- Default user agent strings of most browsers have pieces of strings from one or more other browsers, so that if the browser is unknown to a website, it can be identified as one of those. For example, Safari has not only "Mozilla/5.0", but also "KHTML" (from which Safari's WebKit was forked) and "Gecko" (the engine of Firefox).
- Some Linux browsers such as GNOME Web identify themselves as Safari in order to aid compatibility.

== Differences in measurement ==
Net Applications, a web analytics firm, in their NetMarketShare report, uses unique visitors to measure web usage. The effect is that users visiting a site ten times will only be counted once by these sources, while they are counted ten times by statistics companies that measure page hits. The statistics released by the company routinely place operating systems sold by Microsoft (Windows) and Apple (Mac OS X) with a high market share in the desktop computer category (through 2013). Vincent Vizzaccaro (EVP – Marketing and Strategic Alliances, Net Applications, 2002–present) has stated that Microsoft and Apple are among the company's clients. The company has also admitted that their statistics are skewed.

Net Applications uses country-level weighting as well. The goal of weighting countries based on their usage is to mitigate selection area based sampling bias. This bias is caused by the differences in the percentage of tracked hits in the sample, and the percentage of global usage tracked by third party sources. This difference is caused by the heavier levels of market usage.

Statistics from the United States government's Digital Analytics Program (DAP) do not represent world-wide usage patterns. DAP uses raw data from a unified Google Analytics account.

== Summary tables ==
The following tables summarize the usage share of all browsers for the indicated months.

Usage share of all browsers
Browser	StatCounterSeptember 2026	WikimediaJuly 2026	CloudflareJuly 2026
Chrome	65.6%	53.9%	68%
Safari	18.7%	25.1%	19%
Edge	6.3%	3.89%	6.7%
Firefox	2.92%	6.2%	3.7%
Samsung Internet	2.45%	2.0%	1.8%
Opera	1.56%	0.83%	1.3%
Others	2.47%	—	—

Usage share of desktop browsers
Browser	W3CounterJune 2026	StatCounterSeptember 2026	WikimediaJuly 2026
Chrome	79.9%	65.72%	56%
Safari	7.4%	7.68%	12%
Edge	2.4%	14.55%	9.6%
Firefox	1.4%	6.01%	13%
Opera	0.3%	2.06%	2.1%
Others	—	3.98%	—

Usage share of mobile browsers
Browser	StatCounterSeptember 2026	WikimediaJune 2026
Chrome	66.01%	43%
Safari	26.33%	33%
Samsung Internet	3.58%	3.2%
Opera	1.21%	0.6%
Firefox	0.76%	1.7%
UC	0.75%	—
Others	1.36%	—

Usage share of tablet browsers
Browser	StatcounterSeptember 2026
Chrome	51.25%
Safari	31.74%
AOSP	12.91%
Samsung Internet	1.47%
Edge	1.03%
Others	1.6%

=== Crossover to smartphones having majority share ===
According to StatCounter web use statistics (a proxy for all use), in the week from 7–13 November 2016, "mobile" (meaning smartphones) alone (without tablets) overtook desktop for the first time and by the end of the year smartphones were in the majority. Since 27 October, the desktop has not shown a majority, even on weekdays.

Previously, according to StatCounter press release, the world has become desktop-minority; as of October 2016, there was about 49% of desktop usage for that month. Since 2019, Asia and Africa have both been mobile-majority, as well as Australia.

In March 2015, for the first time in the US the number of mobile-only adult internet users exceeded the number of desktop-only internet users with 11.6% of the digital population only using mobile compared to 10.6% only using desktop; this also means the majority, 78%, use both desktop and mobile to access the internet.

== Older reports (2000–2019) ==
=== StatCounter (Jan 2009 to October 2019) ===
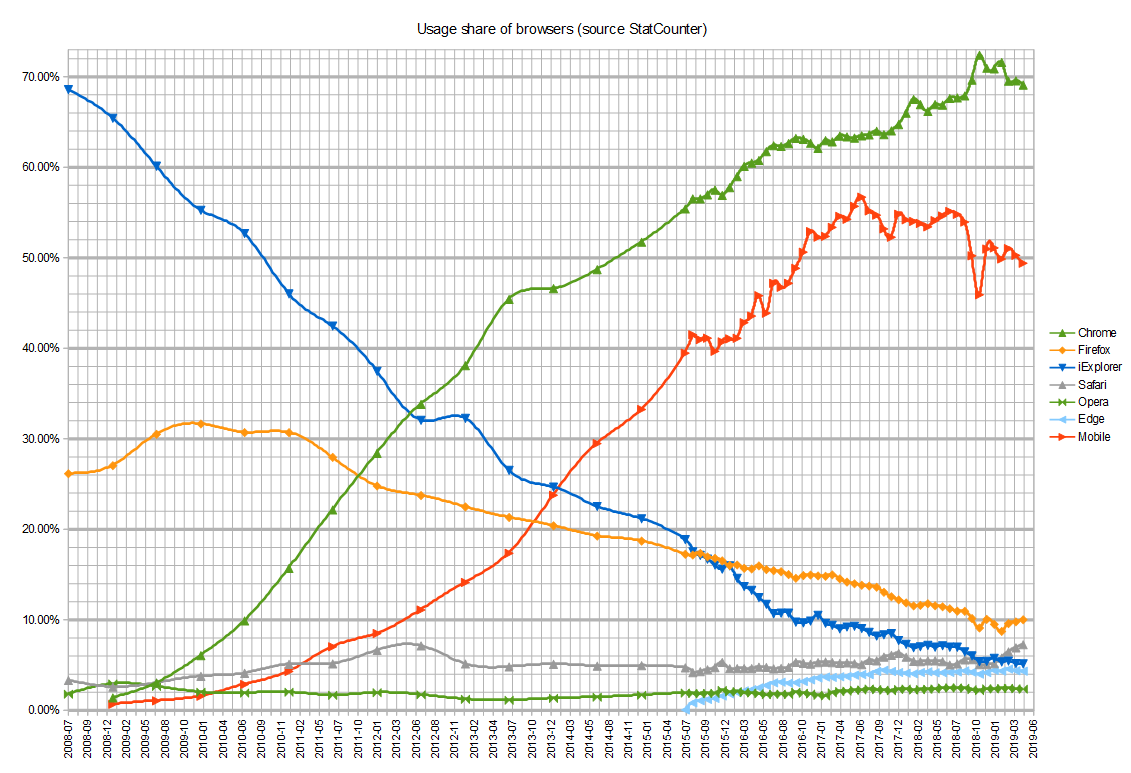
Usage share of web browsers according to StatCounter from 2008-07 to 2019-05

StatCounter statistics are directly derived from hits (not unique visitors) from 3 million sites using StatCounter totaling more than 15 billion hits per month. No weightings are used.

Global Desktop stats from StatCounter (Top 5 browsers)
Date	Chrome	Firefox	Safari	Internet Explorer	Edge Legacy	Other	Mobile
October 2019	68.91%	9.25%	8.68%	4.45%	4.51%	4.20%	54.07%
September 2019	69.08%	9.54%	7.41%	4.99%	4.71%	4.27%	53.75%
August 2019	71.15%	9.52%	5.80%	4.40%	4.71%	4.43%	53.66%
July 2019	71.05%	9.52%	5.41%	5.00%	4.60%	4.41%	53.08%
June 2019	70.71%	9.76%	5.64%	5.03%	4.50%	4.36%	52.69%
May 2019	69.09%	10.01%	7.25%	5.14%	4.32%	4.21%	49.40%
April 2019	69.55%	9.78%	6.91%	5.16%	4.37%	4.23%	50.27%
March 2019	69.52%	9.58%	6.46%	5.44%	4.56%	4.44%	51.01%
February 2019	71.58%	8.72%	5.77%	5.34%	4.34%	4.24%	49.87%
January 2019	70.88%	9.50%	5.15%	5.74%	4.41%	4.32%	51.09%
December 2018	70.95%	10.05%	5.06%	5.40%	4.17%	4.38%	50.97%
November 2018	72.38%	9.10%	5.06%	5.38%	4.00%	4.07%	45.91%
October 2018	69.64%	10.14%	5.61%	6.01%	4.21%	4.38%	50.22%
September 2018	67.88%	10.94%	5.58%	6.45%	4.36%	4.78%	53.95%
August 2018	67.66%	10.96%	5.13%	6.97%	4.24%	5.03%	54.80%
July 2018	67.60%	11.23%	5.01%	6.97%	4.19%	5.00%	55.12%
June 2018	66.87%	11.44%	5.38%	7.13%	4.16%	5.02%	54.62%
May 2018	66.93%	11.55%	5.48%	6.97%	4.15%	4.92%	54.11%
April 2018	66.17%	11.78%	5.48%	7.17%	4.26%	5.14%	53.42%
March 2018	66.93%	11.60%	5.37%	7.02%	4.18%	4.90%	53.80%
February 2018	67.49%	11.54%	5.42%	6.91%	4.04%	4.60%	54.02%
January 2018	65.98%	11.87%	5.87%	7.28%	4.11%	4.88%	54.20%
December 2017	64.72%	12.21%	6.29%	7.71%	4.18%	4.88%	54.81%
November 2017	64.02%	12.55%	6.08%	8.47%	4.29%	4.59%	52.27%
October 2017	63.60%	13.04%	5.89%	8.34%	4.43%	4.69%	53.19%
September 2017	63.98%	13.60%	5.46%	8.21%	4.30%	4.46%	54.71%
August 2017	63.58%	13.73%	5.51%	8.61%	3.95%	4.61%	55.18%
July 2017	63.48%	13.82%	5.04%	9.03%	3.95%	4.68%	56.70%
June 2017	63.23%	13.98%	5.15%	9.28%	3.89%	4.47%	55.69%
May 2017	63.36%	14.17%	5.25%	9.20%	3.74%	4.28%	54.25%
April 2017	63.45%	14.53%	5.20%	9.00%	3.71%	4.11%	54.58%
March 2017	62.81%	14.97%	5.28%	9.39%	3.64%	3.92%	53.36%
February 2017	62.95%	14.81%	5.34%	9.62%	3.68%	3.60%	52.37%
January 2017	62.09%	14.85%	5.28%	10.49%	3.58%	3.71%	52.28%
July 2016	62.38%	15.43%	4.59%	10.67%	3.04%	3.85%	47.18%

Date	Chrome	Internet Explorer	Firefox	Safari	Opera	Other	Mobile
January 2016	57.75%	16.00%	15.95%	4.60%	2.03%	3.68%	41.04%
July 2015	55.39%	18.86%	17.24%	4.70%	1.91%	1.90%	39.46%
January 2015	51.72%	21.16%	18.70%	4.94%	1.67%	1.81%	33.24%
July 2014	48.69%	22.52%	19.25%	4.89%	1.45%	2.19%	29.48%
January 2014	46.60%	24.65%	20.39%	5.09%	1.32%	1.96%	23.77%
July 2013	45.40%	26.50%	21.31%	4.80%	1.11%	1.32%	17.35%
January 2013	38.08%	32.25%	22.47%	5.12%	1.22%	0.86%	14.13%
July 2012	33.81%	32.04%	23.73%	7.12%	1.72%	1.58%	11.09%
January 2012	28.40%	37.45%	24.78%	6.62%	1.95%	0.79%	8.49%
July 2011	22.14%	42.45%	27.95%	5.14%	1.66%	0.63%	7.02%
January 2011	15.68%	46.00%	30.68%	5.09%	2.00%	0.55%	4.30%
July 2010	9.88%	52.68%	30.69%	4.09%	1.91%	0.74%	2.86%
January 2010	6.04%	55.25%	31.64%	3.76%	2.00%	1.31%	1.56%
July 2009	3.01%	60.11%	30.50%	3.02%	2.64%	0.72%	1.05%
January 2009	1.38%	65.41%	27.03%	2.57%	2.92%	0.70%	0.67%

=== W3Counter (May 2007 to December 2022) ===
This site counts the last 15,000 page views from each of approximately 80,000 websites. This limits the influence of sites with more than 15,000 monthly visitors on the usage statistics. W3Counter is not affiliated with the World Wide Web Consortium (W3C).

Global Web Stats from W3Counter
Date	Google Chrome	Safari	Internet Explorer & Edge	Firefox	Opera
December 2022	71.2%	15.1%	3.7%	3.0%	1.3%
November 2022	67.9%	17.2%	4.2%	3.3%	1.5%
October 2022	66.7%	17.7%	4.4%	3.2%	1.5%
September 2022	69.2%	15.6%	4.2%	3.4%	1.2%
August 2022	69.9%	15.7%	3.7%	3.5%	1.1%
July 2022	68.7%	16.9%	3.4%	3.6%	1.3%
June 2022	68.3%	16.3%	3.3%	3.8%	1.3%
May 2022	71.6%	15.2%	3.8%	2.6%	1.1%
April 2022	70.2%	15.4%	4.8%	2.8%	1.1%
March 2022	64.9%	15.4%	6.3%	4.1%	2.5%
February 2022	67.9%	16.2%	5.5%	3.2%	1.4%
January 2022	64.4%	17.0%	6.1%	4.0%	1.4%
December 2021	66.0%	16.9%	5.2%	3.2%	1.5%
November 2021	66.6%	16.4%	5.2%	3.2%	1.3%
October 2021	65.4%	16.5%	5.9%	3.6%	1.2%
September 2021	63.3%	17.7%	5.4%	5.8%	1.3%
August 2021	62.9%	17.7%	4.9%	4.8%	1.1%
July 2021	65.7%	16.6%	4.7%	2.9%	1.1%
June 2021	65.3%	16.7%	5.2%	3.3%	1.4%
May 2021	65.2%	16.6%	4.9%	3.2%	1.4%
April 2021	65.3%	16.7%	5.7%	4.1%	1.6%
March 2021	65.2%	17.5%	5.6%	4.4%	1.6%
February 2021	65.3%	17.1%	5.6%	4.3%	1.5%
January 2021	65.3%	17.0%	5.6%	4.1%	1.5%
December 2020	65.3%	16.7%	5.5%	4.4%	1.5%
November 2020	66.1%	17.1%	5.3%	4.5%	1.5%
October 2020	63.8%	17.9%	5.6%	4.6%	1.6%
September 2020	62.6%	18.0%	6.3%	4.8%	1.6%
August 2020	61.8%	17.3%	7.1%	4.8%	1.5%
July 2020	61.0%	16.1%	8.9%	5.0%	1.6%
June 2020	63.0%	14.4%	8.0%	5.1%	1.8%
May 2020	63.7%	13.6%	6.3%	4.5%	2.1%
April 2020	62.4%	12.2%	7.0%	4.6%	2.5%
March 2020	59.3%	12.3%	9.1%	4.5%	3.0%
February 2020	58.1%	13.0%	12.9%	5.4%	2.7%
January 2020	58.2%	17.7%	7.1%	5.5%	2.6%
December 2019	56.1%	18.1%	7.5%	5.5%	3.7%
November 2019	59.2%	14.6%	9.6%	6.1%	3.5%
October 2019	57.0%	13.4%	9.4%	6.9%	3.3%
September 2019	58.7%	12.5%	8.1%	6.3%	3.0%
August 2019	56.8%	12.3%	7.8%	5.3%	2.1%
July 2019	55.4%	12.5%	8.6%	6.5%	2.8%
June 2019	56.8%	13.3%	8.1%	6.8%	2.4%
May 2019	57.4%	13.5%	6.8%	6.8%	2.4%
April 2019	60.1%	12.7%	6.8%	6.1%	2.8%
March 2019	65.4%	13.6%	6.2%	6.3%	3.0%
February 2019	63.9%	14.1%	7.1%	6.5%	3.1%
January 2019	64.5%	14.3%	7.0%	6.3%	3.0%
December 2018	64.4%	14.6%	7.2%	6.3%	3.0%
November 2018	64.7%	14.2%	7.4%	6.7%	3.0%
October 2018	61.7%	13.1%	6.6%	6.5%	2.8%
September 2018	62.2%	13.4%	6.3%	7.1%	3.0%
August 2018	60.3%	13.1%	6.7%	7.2%	3.1%
July 2018	57.8%	14.0%	5.9%	6.0%	3.7%
June 2018	55.2%	13.5%	6.1%	5.4%	3.2%
May 2018	56.6%	14.7%	7.1%	6.5%	3.5%
April 2018	58.8%	14.6%	6.9%	6.4%	3.5%
March 2018	60.6%	15.4%	7.6%	7.2%	2.9%
February 2018	59.9%	15.7%	7.3%	8.5%	3.4%
January 2018	58.4%	15.3%	7.8%	9.1%	3.9%
December 2017	58.8%	14.5%	8.0%	9.3%	4.0%
November 2017	59.2%	14.3%	8.1%	9.3%	4.0%
October 2017	58.8%	13.4%	9.8%	9.1%	3.2%
September 2017	57.0%	13.2%	11.2%	9.1%	3.2%
August 2017	56.8%	14.9%	9.1%	8.1%	5.0%
July 2017	64.0%	13.6%	8.0%	6.8%	3.2%
June 2017	62.4%	13.5%	8.9%	7.8%	3.2%
May 2017	58.1%	14.9%	9.7%	9.0%	3.0%
April 2017	61.2%	15.9%	8.2%	6.3%	2.9%
March 2017	58.9%	15.2%	7.2%	7.2%	3.8%
February 2017	57.2%	13.2%	8.5%	9.0%	5.0%
January 2017	58.4%	13.3%	8.1%	9.5%	4.4%
July 2016	59.5%	13.1%	10.2%	10.1%	2.6%
January 2016	47.3%	20.7%	12.3%	11.4%	3.2%
July 2015	46.5%	16.5%	13.6%	13.3%	3.9%
January 2015	43.2%	15.2%	17.3%	15.3%	3.1%
July 2014	38.7%	15.4%	21.3%	15.3%	3.1%
January 2014	34.3%	17.9%	20.4%	18.4%	2.7%
July 2013	33.4%	15.2%	23.0%	19.1%	2.4%
January 2013	30.1%	14.8%	27.6%	20.1%	2.3%
July 2012	28.5%	13.4%	28.7%	23.2%	2.2%
January 2012	25.3%	6.7%	31.8%	25.5%	2.5%
July 2011	20.2%	6.6%	36.6%	28.5%	2.4%
January 2011	14.6%	6.0%	41.1%	31.9%	2.1%
July 2010	10.6%	2.1%	48.3%	34.1%	2.3%
January 2010	6.4%	5.5%	50.6%	32.9%	2.2%
July 2009	3.4%	4.8%	54.4%	32.4%	1.8%
January 2009	0.2%	2.8%	60.2%	32.1%	2.0%
July 2008		2.5%	62.3%	30.4%	2.1%
January 2008		2.8%	63.1%	29.1%	2.0%
July 2007		2.2%	66.9%	25.1%	1.8%
May 2007		2.4%	67.7%	25.0%	1.8%
Date	Google Chrome	Safari	Internet Explorer	Firefox	Opera

=== Net Applications (May 2016 to November 2019) ===
Net Applications bases its usage share on statistics from 40,000 websites having around 160 million unique visitors per month. The mean site has 1300 unique visitors per day.

Global usage share of desktop browsers data from: Net Applications
Period	Chrome	Firefox	Internet Explorer	Edge Legacy	Safari	Sogou Explorer	QQ	Opera	Yandex	UC
November 2019	67.15%	8.15%	6.81%	5.97%	5.29%	1.78%	1.66%	1.28%	0.81%	0.40%
October 2019	67.38%	8.62%	6.47%	6.10%	4.82%	1.83%	1.66%	1.32%	0.84%	0.31%
September 2019	68.33%	8.68%	6.30%	5.93%	4.26%	1.59%	1.45%	1.42%	0.98%	0.34%
August 2019	68.60%	8.43%	7.50%	6.34%	3.85%	1.72%	1.58%	1.39%	0.86%	0.26%
July 2019	67.22%	8.34%	7.44%	5.80%	3.40%	1.70%	1.52%	1.43%	0.88%	0.34%
June 2019	66.29%	8.86%	7.30%	6.03%	3.32%	1.35%	1.30%	1.54%	0.87%	0.32%
May 2019	67.90%	9.46%	7.70%	5.36%	3.30%	1.47%	1.33%	1.52%	0.95%	0.39%
April 2019	65.64%	10.23%	8.44%	5.53%	3.58%	1.63%	1.40%	1.57%	0.89%	0.37%
March 2019	67.88%	9.27%	7.34%	5.20%	3.69%	1.50%	1.33%	1.65%	0.97%	0.44%
February 2019	66.89%	9.39%	8.23%	4.79%	3.56%	1.49%	1.60%	1.63%	0.83%	0.46%
January 2019	67.29%	9.92%	7.94%	4.61%	4.00%	1.24%	1.31%	1.60%	0.80%	0.44%
December 2018	67.18%	9.58%	8.31%	4.09%	3.71%	1.69%	1.71%	1.68%	0.68%	0.51%
November 2018	65.57%	8.96%	9.64%	4.22%	3.74%	1.73%	1.68%	1.56%	0.67%	0.55%
October 2018	66.43%	9.25%	9.48%	4.28%	3.74%	1.43%	1.53%	1.55%	0.63%	0.49%
September 2018	66.28%	9.62%	9.94%	4.08%	3.59%	1.23%	1.20%	1.61%	0.59%	0.60%
August 2018	65.21%	9.76%	10.86%	4.30%	3.65%	1.15%	1.14%	1.66%	0.64%	0.52%
July 2018	64.67%	9.68%	11.15%	4.21%	3.49%	1.49%	1.55%	1.58%	0.46%	0.60%
June 2018	62.77%	10.12%	12.22%	4.25%	3.70%	1.45%	1.49%	1.58%	0.56%	0.59%
May 2018	62.85%	9.92%	11.82%	4.26%	3.71%	1.47%	1.55%	1.67%	0.58%	0.75%
April 2018	61.77%	10.52%	12.20%	4.46%	3.94%	1.60%	1.72%	1.50%	0.72%	0.80%
March 2018	61.77%	10.52%	12.20%	4.46%	3.94%	1.49%	1.38%	1.45%	0.65%	0.66%
February 2018	61.55%	11.15%	11.66%	4.44%	4.39%	1.32%	1.21%	1.73%	0.72%	0.63%
January 2018	61.41%	10.85%	11.84%	4.67%	4.18%	1.64%	1.20%	1.60%	0.62%	0.71%
December 2017	60.57%	11.02%	12.36%	4.61%	4.00%	1.79%	1.47%	1.56%	0.58%	0.76%
November 2017	60.61%	11.42%	12.04%	4.21%	3.85%	1.84%	1.53%	1.51%	0.77%	0.78%
October 2017	59.99%	11.71%	12.25%	4.06%	3.78%	1.92%	1.80%	1.41%	0.55%	0.70%
September 2017	60.67%	13.26%	11.80%	3.71%	3.54%	1.70%	1.28%	1.38%	0.55%	0.66%
August 2017	61.05%	12.26%	12.07%	3.67%	3.14%	1.74%	1.70%	1.52%	0.59%	0.74%
July 2017	59.65%	12.59%	12.96%	3.78%	3.22%	1.72%	1.64%	1.58%	0.61%	0.82%
June 2017	60.08%	12.53%	12.75%	3.80%	3.24%	1.66%	1.40%	1.55%	0.66%	0.97%
May 2017	58.92%	12.90%	12.91%	3.97%	3.38%	1.81%	1.32%	1.56%	0.91%	0.78%
April 2017	55.95%	13.13%	14.41%	3.97%	3.35%	1.86%	1.98%	1.77%	1.29%	0.72%
March 2017	55.81%	15.50%	14.61%	3.63%	3.26%	1.69%	0.96%	1.93%	0.38%	0.78%
February 2017	59.17%	14.88%	11.82%	3.22%	3.13%	1.32%	0.84%	1.59%	0.52%	0.61%
January 2017	56.65%	15.56%	14.93%	3.32%	3.43%	1.33%	0.85%	1.41%	0.36%	0.52%
July 2016	55.50%	15.27%	14.79%	2.97%	4.57%	1.34%	0.79%	1.61%	0.86%	0.32%
May 2016	56.20%	14.79%	14.89%	2.31%	4.67%	1.05%	0.60%	2.95%	0.50%	0.31%

=== Wikimedia (April 2009 to March 2015) ===
Usage in Wikimedia during 2012

Wikimedia traffic analysis reports are based on server logs of about 4 billion page requests per month, based on the user agent information that accompanied the requests. These server logs cover requests to all the Wikimedia Foundation projects, including Wikipedia, Wikimedia Commons, Wiktionary, Wikibooks, Wikiquote, Wikisource, Wikinews, Wikiversity and others.

Note: Wikimedia has recently had a large percentage of unrecognised browsers, previously counted as Firefox, that are now assumed to be Internet Explorer 11 fixed in the February 2014 and later numbers. And February 2014 numbers include mobile for Internet Explorer and Firefox (not included in Android). Chrome did not include the mobile numbers at that time while Android does since there was an "Android browser" that was the default browser at that time.

Usage share data from Wikimedia visitor log analysis report: All Requests
Period	Chrome	Firefox	Internet Explorer	Safari			Opera			Android	Mobile Total
Period	Chrome	Firefox	Internet Explorer	Desktop	Mobile	Total	Desktop	Mobile	Total	Android	Mobile Total
March 2015	29.61%	14.23%	10.86%	2.97%	16.68%	19.65%	0.65%	1.41%	2.06%	17.45%	38.37%
February 2014	27.94%	12.00%	17.01%	3.83%	17.97%	21.80%	1.50%	1.27%	2.77%	12.59%	35.03%
January 2014	27.32%	18.15%	11.78%	3.88%	19.41%	23.29%	1.51%	1.32%	2.83%	12.89%	35.01%
December 2013	30.70%	17.90%	11.48%	3.45%	18.03%	21.48%	1.54%	1.32%	2.86%	11.52%	32.20%
November 2013	35.04%	17.37%	13.80%	2.52%	15.17%	17.69%	1.49%	1.16%	2.65%	9.45%	26.99%
October 2013	33.93%	16.12%	15.46%	2.36%	14.34%	16.70%	1.53%	1.17%	2.70%	9.00%	26.32%
August 2013	31.07%	17.17%	15.98%	2.69%	15.92%	18.61%	1.87%	1.14%	3.01%	9.18%	28.25%
July 2013	32.33%	16.90%	15.65%	2.63%	15.66%	18.29%	2.06%	1.18%	3.24%	8.56%	27.38%
June 2013	35.16%	17.83%	15.93%	2.37%	13.13%	15.50%	2.18%	1.10%	3.28%	6.45%	22.32%
May 2013	35.23%	17.79%	16.99%	2.19%	12.63%	14.82%	2.41%	1.14%	3.55%	6.32%	21.83%
April 2013	34.16%	18.16%	16.95%	2.31%	13.61%	15.92%	2.42%	1.18%	3.60%	6.55%	23.13%
March 2013	33.22%	16.28%	17.03%	4.34%	13.59%	17.93%	2.55%	1.18%	3.73%	6.51%	23.13%
February 2013	32.21%	16.80%	18.27%	4.56%	13.06%	17.62%	2.57%	1.21%	3.78%	6.25%	22.44%
January 2013	31.34%	17.61%	18.68%	4.64%	12.66%	17.30%	2.72%	1.16%	3.88%	6.01%	21.71%
July 2012	27.20%	19.23%	23.70%	4.88%	10.60%	15.48%	3.00%	1.50%	4.50%	4.55%	18.19%
January 2012	22.20%	22.30%	29.51%	5.87%	7.58%	13.45%	3.94%	1.21%	5.15%	3.21%	13.40%
July 2011	16.81%	24.98%	36.78%	5.44%	5.31%	10.75%	3.32%	0.90%	4.22%	1.71%	9.80%
January 2011	11.75%	28.71%	41.56%	5.53%	3.73%	9.26%	3.55%	0.70%	4.25%	0.90%	6.90%

Usage share data from Wikimedia visitor log analysis report
Period	Internet Explorer	Firefox	Chrome	Safari	Opera	Other Mozilla	Mobile
December 2010	42.12%	28.82%	11.18%	5.70%	3.67%	0.52%	6.4%
July 2010	47.74%	30.43%	7.52%	5.18%	2.89%	0.53%	4.5%
January 2010	51.01%	30.85%	4.81%	5.13%	3.18%	0.56%	3.1%
July 2009	54.55%	31.52%	2.77%	4.51%	2.38%	0.70%	2.4%
April 2009	57.37%	30.71%	1.93%	3.86%	2.57%	0.68%	1.9%

=== Clicky (September 2009 to August 2013) ===
Global usage share data from GetClicky.com
Period	Internet Explorer	Chrome	Firefox	Safari	Opera	Other Mozilla
August 2013	28.76%	39.48%	20.86%	9.55%	1.04%	0.31%
July 2013	28.64%	39.44%	21.27%	9.19%	1.14%	0.31%
June 2013	29.08%	38.92%	21.22%	9.28%	1.17%	0.32%
May 2013	29.14%	38.39%	21.19%	9.86%	1.13%	0.29%
April 2013	30.57%	37.12%	21.36%	9.48%	1.22%	0.27%
March 2013	31.92%	35.83%	21.29%	9.52%	1.21%	0.24%
February 2013	33.10%	34.57%	21.40%	9.51%	1.21%	0.20%
January 2013	35.67%	32.79%	20.79%	9.41%	1.16%	0.19%
July 2012	35.77%	29.87%	23.61%	9.18%	1.43%	0.13%
January 2012	38.59%	25.75%	24.74%	9.55%	1.28%	0.09%
July 2011	42.06%	20.25%	27.35%	9.07%	1.20%	0.07%
January 2011	46.00%	15.25%	28.74%	8.62%	1.27%	0.12%
July 2010	49.26%	10.53%	30.88%	7.89%	1.26%	0.18%
January 2010	50.73%	6.85%	32.89%	7.79%	1.51%	0.23%
September 2009	54.58%	4.25%	31.96%	7.44%	1.34%	0.43%

=== StatOwl.com (September 2008 to November 2012) ===
US usage share data from StatOwl.com
Period	Internet Explorer	Firefox, Other Mozilla	Chrome	Safari	Opera	Gecko	Netscape Navigator
November 2012	43.38%	19.42%	24.91%	9.27%	0.75%	0.84%	
October 2012	44.40%	19.62%	24.09%	9.42%	0.68%	0.55%	
September 2012	45.03%	19.26%	23.31%	9.84%	0.65%	0.78%	
August 2012	45.87%	19.49%	22.53%	10.14%	0.59%	0.43%	
July 2012	46.95%	19.03%	22.31%	9.96%	0.52%	0.36%	
June 2012	46.69%	19.42%	21.76%	9.80%	0.55%	0.30%	
May 2012	46.47%	20.47%	20.88%	10.04%	0.55%	0.30%	
April 2012	48.28%	19.73%	19.39%	10.51%	0.44%	0.27%	
March 2012	49.18%	19.46%	18.10%	11.14%	0.38%	0.29%	
February 2012	50.98%	19.00%	17.05%	11.16%	0.33%	0.22%	
January 2012	51.81%	18.98%	16.77%	10.93%	0.38%	0.15%	
December 2011	51.42%	19.73%	16.78%	10.69%	0.39%	0.16%	
November 2011	51.17%	20.15%	16.13%	11.29%	0.38%	0.16%	
October 2011	52.59%	20.06%	15.01%	11.13%	0.36%	0.17%	
September 2011	53.79%	20.18%	13.79%	10.81%	0.37%	0.21%	
August 2011	53.81%	20.61%	13.64%	10.75%	0.39%	0.15%	
July 2011	55.26%	20.29%	12.58%	10.68%	0.37%	0.13%	
June 2011	56.23%	20.85%	12.04%	9.77%	0.46%		
May 2011	57.48%	20.43%	11.06%	9.88%	0.49%		
April 2011	57.08%	21.40%	10.85%	9.47%	0.53%		
March 2011	60.27%	19.57%	9.60%	9.62%	0.42%		
February 2011	60.92%	19.21%	9.13%	9.59%	0.40%	0.42%	
January 2011	61.28%	19.57%	8.80%	9.40%	0.39%	0.31%	
December 2010	60.98%	20.14%	8.61%	9.33%	0.40%	0.24%	
November 2010	62.13%	19.69%	7.46%	9.42%	0.37%	0.18%	
October 2010	62.54%	19.76%	7.17%	9.03%	0.36%	0.15%	
September 2010	62.68%	20.51%	6.99%	8.83%	0.36%	0.15%	
August 2010	62.66%	20.94%	6.83%	8.83%	0.35%	0.14%	
July 2010	61.73%	21.66%	6.95%	8.94%	0.36%	0.11%	
June 2010	63.37%	21.26%	6.24%	8.52%	0.33%		
May 2010	64.17%	21.12%	5.59%	8.31%	0.37%		
April 2010	64.55%	21.35%	5.23%	8.12%	0.40%		
March 2010	66.34%	19.90%	4.39%	8.59%	0.31%		
February 2010	66.99%	19.48%	3.98%	9.00%	0.24%	0.06%	
January 2010	66.33%	20.31%	3.87%	8.94%	0.26%	0.06%	
December 2009	66.12%	20.82%	3.51%	8.73%	0.30%	0.07%	
November 2009	67.74%	20.15%	2.88%	8.56%	0.28%	0.10%	
October 2009	68.38%	20.32%	2.56%	8.09%	0.27%	0.14%	
September 2009	67.25%	21.12%	2.41%	8.46%	0.28%	0.21%	
August 2009	68.37%	21.32%	2.21%	7.29%	0.28%	0.23%	
July 2009	69.29%	21.06%	2.05%	6.77%	0.30%	0.24%	
June 2009	71.44%	19.48%	1.93%	6.30%	0.33%	0.22%	
May 2009	71.35%	20.26%	1.64%	5.95%	0.31%	0.21%	
April 2009	71.38%	20.46%	1.43%	5.80%	0.31%	0.19%	
March 2009	72.03%	20.00%	1.19%	5.91%	0.30%		0.10%
February 2009	74.04%	18.64%	0.97%	5.57%	0.27%		0.10%
January 2009	73.05%	19.39%	0.96%	5.72%	0.29%		0.12%
December 2008	70.89%	20.87%	0.95%	6.32%	0.33%		0.13%
November 2008	72.07%	19.78%	0.68%	6.57%	0.29%		0.13%
October 2008	73.45%	18.88%	0.57%	6.22%	0.26%		0.16%
September 2008	74.53%	18.14%	0.52%	5.98%	0.22%		0.17%

92% of sites monitored by StatOwl serve predominantly United States market.

=== AT Internet Institute (Europe, July 2007 to June 2010) ===
AT Internet Institute was formerly known as XiTi.

Method: Only counts visits to local sites in 23 European countries and then averages the percentages for those 23 European countries independent of population size.

Europe usage share data from AT Internet Institute
Date	Internet Explorer	Netscape	Firefox	Opera	Safari	Chrome	Source
June 2010	53.8%		30.6%	2.4%	6.8%	5.7%	2010-6
March 2010	57.1%		29.6%	2.2%	5.2%	5.3%	2010-3
September 2009	62.0%		28.4%	2.2%	4.3%	2.8%	2009–11
April 2009	63.6%	0.6%	28.4%	2.2%	3.4%	1.7%	2009-5
March 2009	64.6%	0.6%	27.8%	2.2%	3.3%	1.4%	2009-5
February 2009	65.6%	0.5%	27.4%	2.1%	3.0%	1.3%	2009-5
January 2009	58.1%	0.6%	32.5%	4.1%	3.0%	1.5%	2009-1
December 2008	58.5%	0.6%	32.3%	4.5%	2.7%	1.3%	2009-1
November 2008	59.5%	0.6%	31.1%	5.1%	2.5%	1.1%	2008-12-22
October 2008	59.2%	0.6%	31.1%	5.4%	2.4%	1.1%	2008-12-22
September 2008	60.2%	0.4%	31.2%	4.8%	2.4%	1.0%	2008-10-10
August 2008	59.4%	0.3%	33.0%	4.5%	2.6%		2008-10-10
July 2008	60.4%	0.3%	32.2%	4.5%	2.4%		2008-10-10
June 2008	60.5%	0.3%	31.4%	5.1%	2.5%		2008-10-10
May 2008	61.7%	0.4%	30.7%	4.7%	2.4%		2008-10-10
April 2008	64.5%	0.5%	28.9%	3.6%	2.4%		2008-10-10
March 2008	65.0%	0.5%	28.8%	3.3%	2.3%		2008-04-30
February 2008	65.6%	0.5%	28.5%	3.2%	2.2%		2008-04-30
January 2008	66.1%	0.5%	28.0%	3.2%	2.1%		2008-04-30
December 2007	66.1%	0.5%	28.0%	3.3%	2.0%		2008-04-30
November 2007	66.9%	0.5%	27.3%	3.2%	1.9%		2008-04-30
October 2007	67.5%	0.4%	27.0%	3.1%	1.8%		2008-04-30
September 2007	66.6%	0.3%	27.7%	3.4%	1.8%		2007-10-30
2–8 July 2007	66.5%	0.3%	27.8%	3.5%	1.7%		2007-07-18

=== TheCounter.com (2000 to 2009) ===
TheCounter.com, a defunct web counter service, identified sixteen versions of six browsers (Internet Explorer, Firefox, Safari, Opera, Netscape, and Konqueror). Other browsers are categorised as either "Netscape compatible" (including Google Chrome, which may also be categorized as "Safari" because of its "Webkit" subtag) or "unknown". Internet Explorer 8 is identified as Internet Explorer 7. Monthly data includes all hits from 2008-02-01 until the end of the month concerned. More than the exact browser type, this data identifies the underlying rendering engine used by various browsers, and the table below aggregates them in the same column.

Global usage share data from TheCounter.com (global statistics)
Period	Internet Explorer	Netscape, Other Mozilla, Firefox	Safari	Opera	Netscape Navigator	Sources
2009 Q4	66.42%	21.13%	10.05%	1.00%	0.05%	Oct, Nov, Dec
2009 Q3	69.07%	20.59%	8.10%	0.89%	0.06%	Jul, Aug, Sep
2009 Q2	70.31%	20.12%	6.44%	0.94%	0.06%	Apr, May, Jun
2009 Q1	71.25%	20.01%	5.47%	0.92%	0.08%	Jan, Feb, Mar
2008 Q4	74.24%	18.66%	4.52%	0.89%	0.07%	Oct, Nov, Dec
2008 Q3	76.33%	17.97%	3.76%	0.84%	0.07%	Jul, Aug, Sep
2008 Q2	78.30%	16.36%	3.41%	0.81%	0.06%	Apr, May, Jun
2008 Q1	78.80%	15.87%	3.32%	0.79%	0.06%	Jan, Feb, Mar
2007 Q4	81.14%	13.81%	3.21%	0.67%	0.06%	Oct, Nov, Dec
2007 Q3	81.63%	13.49%	3.00%	0.66%	0.06%	Jul, Aug, Sep
2007 Q2	82.97%	12.41%	2.87%	0.64%	0.06%	Apr, May, Jun
2007 Q1	83.69%	11.57%	2.92%	0.57%	0.06%	Jan, Feb, Mar
2006 Q4	84.11%	11.13%	2.80%	0.60%	0.05%	Oct Nov, Dec
2006 Q3	84.48%	10.56%	2.27%	0.73%	0.06%	Jul, Aug, Sep
2006 Q2	86.32%	9.03%	1.89%	0.70%	0.05%	Apr, May, Jun
2006 Q1	90.01%	6.77%	1.40%	0.58%	0.05%	Jan, Feb, Mar
2005 Q4	87.25%	8.60%	1.83%	0.71%	0.07%	Oct, Nov, Dec
2005 Q3	87.58%	8.42%	1.60%	0.67%	0.07%	July, Aug, Sep
2005 Q2	90.90%	6.02%	0.99%	0.51%	0.09%	Apr, May, Jun
2005 Q1	90.77%	5.73%	1.00%	0.54%	0.11%	Jan, Feb, Mar
2004 Q4	90.98%	5.10%	0.77%	0.68%	0.18%	Oct, Nov, Dec
2004 Q3	92.70%	3.57%	0.73%	0.65%	0.20%	Jul, Aug, Sep
2004 Q2	95.04%	2.37%	0.67%	0.51%	0.32%	Apr, May, Jun
2004 Q1	94.28%	2.70%		0.52%	0.36%	Jan, Feb, Mar
2003 Q4						Oct, Nov, Dec
2003 Q3						Jul, Aug, Sep
2003 Q2	94.43%	2.22%		0.66%	1.45%	Apr, May, Jun
2003 Q1	94.18%	2.15%		0.65%	1.77%	Jan, Feb, Mar
2002 Q4	93.94%	1.67%		0.83%	2.31%	Oct, Nov, Dec
2002 Q3	93.32%	1.36%		0.94%	3.04%	Jul, Aug, Sep
2002 Q2	92.47%	1.13%		0.82%	4.13%	Apr, May, Jun
2002 Q1	92.40%	0.93%		0.52%	4.67%	Jan, Feb, Mar
2001 Q4	90.83%	0.71%		0.36%	5.23%	Oct, Nov, Dec
2001 Q3	88.43%	0.26%		0.31%	6.49%	Jul, Aug, Sep
2001 Q2	87.99%	0.27%		0.28%	7.46%	Apr, May, Jun
2001 Q1	86.80%	0.30%		0.22%	9.84%	Jan, Feb, Mar
2000 Q4	83.95%	0.14%		0.14%	12.61%	Oct, Nov, Dec
2000 Q3	82.76%	0.04%		0.14%	14.35%	Jul, Aug, Sep
2000 Q2	80.30%	0.02%		0.12%	17.54%	Apr, May, Jun
2000 Q1	79.09%	0.00%		0.13%	19.25%	Jan, Feb, Mar
Period	Internet Explorer	Netscape, Other Mozilla, Firefox	Safari	Opera	Netscape Navigator	Sources

=== OneStat.com (April 2002 to March 2009) ===
Global usage share data from OneStat.com (press releases)
Period	Internet Explorer	Other Mozilla, Firefox	Safari	Chrome	Opera	Netscape	Netscape Navigator
March 2009	79.79%	15.59%	2.65%	0.86%	0.54%	0.31%	
November 2008	81.36%	14.67%	2.42%	0.54%	0.55%	0.32%	
February 2008	83.27%	13.76%	2.18%		0.55%	0.14%	
June 2007	84.66%	12.72%	1.79%		0.61%	0.11%	
January 2007	85.81%	11.69%	1.64%		0.58%	0.13%	
November 2006	85.24%	12.15%	1.61%		0.69%	0.11%	
October 2006	85.85%	11.49%	1.61%		0.69%	0.12%	
July 2006	83.05%	12.93%	1.84%		1.00%	0.16%	
May 2006	85.17%	11.79%	2.02%		0.79%	0.15%	
January 2006	85.82%	11.23%	1.88%		0.77%	0.16%	
November 2005	85.45%	11.51%	1.75%		0.77%	0.26%	
April 2005	86.63%	8.69%	1.26%		1.03%	1.08%	
February 2005	87.28%	8.45%	1.21%		1.09%	1.11%	
November 2004	88.90%	7.35%	0.91%		1.33%		
May 2004	93.9%	2.1%	0.71%		1.02%		
January 2004	94.8%	1.8%	0.48%		0.8%		
July 2003	95.4%	1.6%	0.25%		0.6%	1.9%	0.6%
February 2003	95.2%	1.2%	0.11%		0.7%	1.9%	1.0%
December 2002	95.0%	1.1%			0.8%	1.9%	1.1%
September 2002	94.9%	0.8%			0.9%	1.8%	1.2%
June 2002	95.3%	0.4%			0.7%	1.5%	1.9%
April 2002	96.6%				0.5%	0.7%	2.1%

US usage share data from OneStat.com (press releases)
Period	Internet Explorer	Other Mozilla, Firefox	Safari	Chrome	Opera	Netscape
March 2009	72.69%	20.40%	4.53%	1.05%	0.49%	0.38%
November 2008	75.54%	18.74%	3.95%	0.62%	0.39%	0.50%
June 2007	75.69%	19.65%	3.77%		0.61%	0.17%
January 2007	78.13%	16.11%	3.68%		0.73%	0.18%

Canadian usage share data from OneStat.com (press releases)
Period	Internet Explorer	Other Mozilla, Firefox	Safari	Chrome	Opera	Netscape
March 2009	65.55%	23.09%	7.36%	1.32%	0.75%	0.56%
November 2008	69.67%	20.38%	7.56%	0.92%	0.76%	0.56%
June 2007	75.76%	16.47%	5.72%		0.69%	0.13%
January 2007	79.00%	14.13%	4.70%		0.71%	0.14%

UK usage share data from OneStat.com (press releases)
Period	Internet Explorer	Other Mozilla, Firefox	Safari	Chrome	Opera	Netscape
March 2009	80.91%	15.16%	1.94%	0.85%	0.60%	0.36%
November 2008	83.77%	11.45%	1.76%	0.43%	0.60%	0.34%
June 2007	86.00%	11.22%	1.61%		0.53%	0.10%
January 2007	86.72%	10.86%	1.78%		0.49%	0.10%

Australian usage share data from OneStat.com (press releases)
Period	Internet Explorer	Other Mozilla, Firefox	Safari	Chrome	Opera	Netscape
June 2007	66.42%	26.32%	1.86%		4.05%	0.24%
January 2007	65.71%	26.68%	1.77%		4.28%	0.24%

French usage share data from OneStat.com (press releases)
Period	Internet Explorer	Other Mozilla, Firefox	Safari	Chrome	Opera	Netscape
March 2009	71.57%	23.48%	2.90%	0.86%	0.54%	0.46%
November 2008	71.50%	23.45%	3.23%	0.59%	0.56%	0.51%

=== ADTECH (Europe, 2004 to 2009) ===
Europe usage share data from ADTECH 's press releases; this is an ad serving company
Period	Internet Explorer	Firefox	Safari	Chrome	Opera	Other Mozilla	Netscape
Q4 2009	63.6%	26.7%	3.6%	2.8%	1.7%	0.7%	
Q1 2009	67.7%	25.3%	2.6%	1.0%	1.4%	1.1%	
Q1 2008	76.2%	18.1%	1.7%		1.0%	2.6%	
Q4 2007	76.0%	18.0%	1.6%		1.0%	2.9%	
July 2007	77.5%	15.5%	1.6%		0.9%	3.9%	
February 2007	77.34%	14.34%	1.63%		0.85%	5.11%	
February–April 2006	83.36%	12.38%	1.67%		0.77%	0.82%	0.38%
September 2005	83.31%	12.41%	1.40%		0.90%	1.06%	0.61%
June 2005	85.10%	10.11%	1.34%		1.21%	1.05%	0.60%
March 2005	86.73%	8.96%			1.12%	1.14%	0.71%
February 2005	87.57%	7.85%			1.05%	1.26%	0.76%
January 2005	87.13%	7.43%			1.70%	1.33%	0.85%
November 2004	89.47%	5.51%			1.01%	2.50%	0.92%
September 2004	92.63%	2.91%			1.00%	2.10%	0.82%
August 2004	93.08%	2.15%			0.89%	2.18%	0.95%
July 2004	93.08%	1.64%			0.99%	2.62%	0.97%
January–April 2004	94.72%				0.73%	2.50%	1.49%

=== WebSideStory (US, February 1999 to June 2006) ===
US usage share data from: WebSideStory
Date	Internet Explorer	Netscape, Other Mozilla	Firefox	Source
June 2006	86.64%		9.95%	19 July 2006
5 January 2006	87.63%		8.88%	12 January 2006
4 November 2005	88.16%	1.61%	8.13%	10 November 2005
23 September 2005	88.46%	1.69%	7.86%	27 September 2005
29 April 2005	88.86%	2.23%	6.75%	10 May 2005
18 February 2005	89.85%	2.47%	5.69%	28 February 2005
14 January 2005	90.28%	2.64%	4.95%	28 February 2005
3 December 2004	91.80%	2.83%	4.06%	28 February 2005
5 November 2004	92.89%	2.95%	3.03%	28 February 2005
8 October 2004	93.21%	3.05%	2.66%	13 December 2004
4 June 2004	95.48%	3.53%		13 December 2004
26 August 2002	95.97%	3.39%		28 August 2002
25 October 2001	89.03%	10.47%		31 October 2001
25 April 2001	86.61%	13.10%		1 May 2001
21 February 2001	87.71%	12.01%		22 February 2001
18 June 2000	86.08%	13.90%		22 February 2001
2 August 1999	75.31%	24.68%		9 August 1999
6 April 1999	68.75%	29.46%		7 April 1999
1 March 1999	66.90%	31.21%		2 March 1999
8 February 1999	64.60%	33.43%		22 February 2001

== Older reports (pre-2000) ==
Market share for several browsers between 1995 and 2010, illustrating the First Browser War (NN vs IE). Firefox was originally named "Phoenix", a name which implied that it would rise like a Phoenix after Netscape was killed off by Microsoft.

GVU WWW user survey (January 1994 to October 1998)

Usage share data from: GVU WWW user survey
Date	Mosaic	Netscape Navigator	Internet Explorer	Source
October 1998		64%	32.2%	Primary Browser in 12 Months
April 1998		70%	22.7%	Browser Expected to Use in 12 Months
October 1997		59.67%	15.13%	Browser Expected to Use in 12 Months
April 1997		81.13%	12.13%	Browser Expected to Use in 12 Months
October 1996		80.45%	12.18%	Browser Expected to Use in 12 Months
April 1996		89.36%	3.76%	Browser Expected to Use in 12 Months
April 1995	9%	54%		Hal Berghel's Cybernautica – "A Web Monopoly"
October 1994	68%	18%		Result Graph – Browser
January 1994	97%			General Results Graphs

EWS Web Server at UIUC (1996 Q2 to 1998)

Usage share data from: EWS Web Server at UIUC
Date	Mosaic	Internet Explorer	Netscape Navigator	Sources
1998 Q4		50.43%	46.87%	Oct 1998, Nov 1998, Dec 1998
1998 Q3		47.90%	48.97%	Jul 1998, Aug 1998, Sep 1998
1998 Q2		43.17%	53.57%	Apr 1998, May 1998, Jun 1998
1998 Q1		39.67%	57.63%	Jan 1998, Feb 1998, Mar 1998
1997 Q4		35.53%	62.23%	Oct 1997, Nov 1997, Dec 1997
1997 Q3		32.40%	64.93%	Jul 1997, Aug 1997, Sep 1997
1997 Q2	0.37%	27.67%	69.77%	Apr 1997, May 1997, Jun 1997
1997 Q1	0.60%	22.87%	74.33%	Jan 1997, Feb 1997, Mar 1997
1996 Q4	1.20%	19.07%	77.13%	Oct 1996, Nov 1996, Dec 1996
1996 Q3	2.47%	13.97%	80.37%	Jul 1996, Aug 1996, Sep 1996
1996 Q2	6.93%	9.60%	82.77%	Apr 1996, May 1996, Jun 1996

ZD Market Intelligence (US, January 1997 to January 1998)

Usage share data from: ZD Market Intelligence
Date	Internet Explorer	Netscape Navigator	Source
January 1998	39%	54%	Behind the numbers: Browser market share
January 1997	21%	63%	Behind the numbers: Browser market share

Zona Research (US, Jan 1997 to Jan 1998)

Usage share data from: Zona Research
Date	Internet Explorer	Netscape Navigator	Source
July 1998	45%	54%	Behind the numbers: Browser market share
September 1997	36%	62%	Behind the numbers: Browser market share
January 1997	28%	70%	Behind the numbers: Browser market share

AdKnowledge (January 1998 to June 1998)

Usage share data from: AdKnowledge
Date	Internet Explorer	Netscape Navigator	Source
June 1998	46%	52%	Behind the numbers: Browser market share
March 1998	42%	57%	Behind the numbers: Browser market share
January 1998	36%	61%	Behind the numbers: Browser market share

Dataquest (1995 to 1997)

Usage share data from: Dataquest
Date	Internet Explorer	Netscape Navigator	Source
1997	39.4%	57.6%	Browser wars: High price, huge rewards
1996	20%	73%	Browser wars: High price, huge rewards
1995	2.9%	80.1%	Browser wars: High price, huge rewards

International Data Corporation (US, 1996 to 1997)

Usage share data from: International Data Corporation
Date	Internet Explorer	Netscape Navigator	Source
1997	23%	51%	Behind the numbers: Browser market share
1996	16%	55%	Behind the numbers: Browser market share

== See also ==
- List of web browsers
- Comparison of web browsers
- Browser wars
- Timeline of web browsers
- Market share
- Usage share of operating systems
- Usage share of BitTorrent clients
- Usage share of instant messaging clients
