= Installed base =

Number of units of a product or service in use

Installed base of a product is the number of units that are currently in use by customers. It provides a measurement of a company's existing customer base and the extent of their investment in a particular product or technology. In contrast to market share, which only reflects sales over a specific period and relative to the total market, the installed base represents the number of units currently in use. This information can be used to evaluate a company's customer base, investment, and market position.

The installed base plays a significant role in various industries, including computing, automotive, medical devices, and home appliances. It can impact the level of support, availability of replacement parts, and other factors. Some companies that have leveraged their installed base include Apple, Microsoft, Nintendo in the computing industry, and Tesla in the automotive industry.

== Significance ==
The installed base of company's products represents a valuable customer base that is already using their products, services or systems. This provides companies with an opportunity to upsell and cross-sell their products to existing customers, as well as to use the information about their customer base to inform future product development and marketing efforts. Companies can use their installed base to determine the average lifespan of their products, which can inform product development and planning, as well as to assess their market position and to track the success of their product over time.

== Characteristics ==
There are several key characteristics that define an installed base, including:

=== Size ===
The size of a company's installed base reflects the number of products, systems, or services currently in use by customers. This can be used as a measure of a company's market position and customer base.

=== Composition ===
The composition of an installed base can be evaluated to determine the types of products, systems or services in use, and the demographics of the customers using them. This information can be used to inform product development, marketing, and sales efforts.

=== Products' lifespan ===
The lifespan of products in the installed base can provide important information about the average lifespan of a company's products and systems. This information can be used to inform product development and planning.

=== Location ===
The geographic location of customers using a company's products, systems or services can be used to inform sales and marketing efforts.

=== Upgrades and replacements ===
The rate at which customers upgrade or replace products in the installed base can provide important information about the success of a company's product and the willingness of customers to invest in new or upgraded versions.

== Relevant industries and markets ==
=== Computing-related industries and markets ===
The installed base of computer systems, such as operating systems and video game consoles/platforms, is a significant factor in their respective industries. In these markets, the size of the installed base is a key indicator of the reach and influence of a particular product or platform.

=== Other industries and markets ===
Installed base is also a significant factor in other industries, such as automotive, medical devices, and home appliances. In these markets, the size of the installed base of a particular product or platform can impact the level of support and availability of replacement parts and accessories.

== Applications ==
The installed base is used in a variety of applications, including:

=== Market analysis ===
The installed base is used to determine the size and growth potential of a particular market.

=== Product planning ===
Manufacturers use the installed base information to plan the development of new products and services, and to determine the potential for future sales.

=== Customer support ===
Service providers use the installed base information to determine the level of support required for a particular product or service, and to allocate resources accordingly.

=== Sales forecasting ===
Sales teams use the installed base information to make informed decisions about sales targets and to allocate resources accordingly.

=== Pricing strategy ===
Manufacturers and service providers use the installed base information to determine the optimal price for their products and services, taking into account the size of the market and the competition.

== Example companies ==
=== Apple Inc. ===
Apple's installed base of iOS devices, such as the iPhone and iPad, has allowed the company to offer a wide variety of accessories and services. Apple's app store and media offerings are tailored to its device ecosystem, providing customers with a seamless experience.

=== Microsoft Corporation ===
Microsoft's installed base of Windows operating systems has provided the company with a platform to offer a diverse array of software and services. Its suite of productivity tools, including Microsoft Office, are designed to be used with Windows computers.

=== Nintendo ===
Nintendo has a large installed base of its video game consoles, which it leverages to sell more games and accessories. For example, the company has a suite of video game series, such as Mario and Zelda, that are designed to work best on Nintendo consoles.

=== Tesla, Inc. ===
Tesla's installed base of electric vehicles provides the company with an opportunity to offer related products and services, such as charging stations and energy storage systems. The company has also leveraged the data generated by its vehicles to improve its self-driving technology.

== See also ==
- Usage share of operating systems
- Comparison of operating systems
