= Usage share of operating systems =

Relative market adoption of operating systems

The usage share of an operating system is the percentage of computers running that operating system (OS). These statistics are estimates as usage data is difficult to obtain and measure. Reliable primary sources are limited and data collection methodology is not formally agreed upon.

Devices connecting to the World Wide Web log which operating system they are using, and so are an approximate measure of OS usage among consumer devices. As of December 2025, among all devices Android, which uses the Linux kernel, is the world's most common operating system to connect to the web with 34.9% of the global market, followed by Windows with 29.98%, iOS with 16.81%, macOS with 2.03%, and other operating systems with 9.06% total.

Between different classes of devices:

- For smartphones and other mobile devices, Android has 72% share of traffic, and Apple's iOS has 28%.
- For desktop computers and laptops, Microsoft Windows has 62.16%, followed by unknown operating systems at 18.75%, Mac OS at 14.58%, desktop Linux at 3.09%, then Google's ChromeOS at 1.42%, as of June 2026.
- For tablets, Apple's iPadOS (a variant of iOS) has 51.23% share and Android has 48.61% worldwide.

Of the top 500 most powerful supercomputers, all since November 2017 have used Linux.

The global server operating system market share has Linux leading with a 63.1% market share, followed by Windows, Unix and other operating systems.

The most numerous type of device with an operating system are embedded systems. Not all embedded systems have operating systems, instead running their application code on the "bare metal"; of those that do have operating systems, a high percentage are standalone or do not have a web browser, which makes their usage share difficult to measure. Some operating systems used in embedded systems are more widely used than some of those mentioned above. For example, modern Intel microprocessors contain an embedded management processor running a version of the Minix operating system.

== Worldwide device shipments ==
Device shipments, 2015
Android/Linux	54.16%
iOS/macOS	12.37%
Windows	11.79%
Other	21.66%
OS device shipments, Gartner

Shipments (to stores) do not necessarily translate to sales to consumers, therefore suggesting the numbers indicate popularity and/or usage could be misleading. Not only do smartphones sell in higher numbers than PCs, but also a lot more by dollar value, with the gap only projected to widen, to well over double.

According to Gartner, the following is the worldwide device shipments (referring to wholesale) by operating system from 2012 to 2016, which includes smartphones, tablets, laptops and PCs together.

Worldwide device shipments by operating system 2012–2016
Source	Year	Total	Android	iOS/macOS	Windows	Others
Gartner	2019	2.161 bln				
Gartner	2017	2.278 bln				
Gartner	2016	2.332 bln		10.63% (248 mln)	11.2% (260 mln)	
Gartner	2015	2.4 bln	54.16% (1.3 bln)	12.37% (297 mln) macOS = 1%	11.79% (283 mln)	21.66%
Gartner	2014		48.61%	11.04%	14.0%	26.34%
Gartner	2013		38.51%	10.12%	13.98%	37.41%
Gartner	2012		22.8%	9.6%	15.62%	51.98%

On 27 January 2016, Paul Thurrott summarized the operating system market, the day after Apple announced "one billion devices":

Apple's "active installed base" is now one billion devices. [..] Granted, some of those Apple devices were probably sold into the marketplace years ago. But that 1 billion figure can and should be compared to the numbers Microsoft touts for Windows 10 (200 million, most recently) or Windows more generally (1.5 billion active users, a number that hasn't moved, magically, in years), and that Google touts for Android (over 1.4 billion, as of September). My understanding of iOS is that the user base was previously thought to be around 800 million strong, and when you factor out Macs and other non-iOS Apple devices, that's probably about right. But as you can see, there are three big personal computing platforms. And only one of them is actually declining. We’ll see how Windows 10 fares over the long term, but even if Microsoft hits the 1 billion figure in 1-2 years as promised, it will by then still be the smallest of those three platforms.

— Paul Thurrott

In 2018, Apple stopped revealing unit sales in its reports. Since 2018, the company have been publishing only revenues per device models which, nonetheless, allowed the analysers to extrapolate the unit sales from the model revenues by applying the wholesale device prices. Other hardware manufacturers usually do not report unit sales.

=== PC shipments ===
For 2015 (and earlier), Gartner reports for "the year, worldwide PC shipments declined for the fourth consecutive year, which started in 2012 with the launch of tablets" with an 8% decline in PC sales for 2015 (not including cumulative decline in sales over the previous years).

Microsoft backed away from their goal of one billion Windows 10 devices in three years (or "by the middle of 2018") and reported on 26 September 2016 that Windows 10 was running on over 400 million devices, and in March 2019, on more than 800 million.

In May 2020, Gartner predicted further decline in all market segments for 2020 due to COVID-19, predicting a decline of 13.6% for all devices. while the "Work from Home Trend Saved PC Market from Collapse", with only a decline of 10.5% predicted for PCs. However, in the end, according to Gartner, PC shipments grew 10.7% in the fourth quarter of 2020 and reached 275 million units in 2020, a 4.8% increase from 2019 and the highest growth in ten years." Apple in 4th place for PCs had the largest growth in shipments for a company in Q4 of 31.3%, while "the fourth quarter of 2020 was another remarkable period of growth for Chromebooks, with shipments increasing around 200% year over year to reach 11.7 million units. In 2020, Chromebook shipments increased over 80% to total nearly 30 million units, largely due to demand from the North American education market." Chromebooks sold more (30 million) than Apple's Macs worldwide (22.5 million) in pandemic year 2020.

According to the Catalyst group, the year 2021 had record high PC shipments with total shipments of 341 million units (including Chromebooks), 15% higher than 2020 and 27% higher than 2019, while being the largest shipment total since 2012.

According to Gartner, worldwide PC shipments declined by 16.2% in 2022, the largest annual decrease since the mid-1990s, due to geopolitical, economic, and supply chain challenges.

In 2024 and 2025, due to lower adoption of Windows 11 and Microsoft ending its support to Windows 10, the number of PCs shipped with pre-installed Windows OS dropped. Pundits attribute the low Windows 11 acceptance to its steep hardware requirements and especially the TPM 2.0 ready chipset requirement and the 2024 CrowdStrike-related IT outages. Meanwhile, the macOS device market share in PC device shipments increased to new heights, with improved numbers seen for Linux devices too. In Q3 2025, the macOS pre-installed device shipments increased by 14.9% year-over-year (YoY), while the overall PC-shipments increased only by 8.1%, in Q2 2025, it grew 21.4% YoY while the global PC-shipments increased only by 6.5%, and in Q1 2025, it grew 7% YoY while the global PC-shipments increased by 4.8%.

=== Tablet computers shipments ===
In 2015, eMarketer estimated at the beginning of the year that the tablet installed base would hit one billion for the first time (with China's use at 328 million, which Google Play doesn't serve or track, and the United States's use second at 156 million). At the end of the year, because of cheap tablets – not counted by all analysts – that goal was met (even excluding cumulative sales of previous years) as:

Sales quintupled to an expected 1 billion units worldwide this year, from 216 million units in 2014, according to projections from the Envisioneering Group.

While that number is far higher than the 200-plus million units globally projected by research firms IDC, Gartner and Forrester, Envisioneering analyst Richard Doherty says the rival estimates miss all the cheap Asian knockoff tablets that have been churning off assembly lines.[..]

Forrester says its definition of tablets "is relatively narrow" while IDC says it includes some tablets by Amazon – but not all.[..]

The top tech purchase of the year continued to be the smartphone, with an expected 1.5 billion sold worldwide, according to projections from researcher IDC. Last year saw some 1.2 billion sold.[..]

Computers didn't fare as well, despite the introduction of Microsoft's latest software upgrade, Windows 10, and the expected but not realized bump it would provide for consumers looking to skip the upgrade and just get a new computer instead.

Some 281 million PCs were expected to be sold, according to IDC, down from 308 million in 2014. Folks tend to be happy with the older computers and keep them for longer, as more of our daily computing activities have moved to the smartphone.[..]

While Windows 10 got good reviews from tech critics, only 11% of the 1-billion-plus Windows user base opted to do the upgrade, according to Microsoft. This suggests Microsoft has a ways to go before the software gets "hit" status. Apple's new operating system El Capitan has been downloaded by 25% of Apple's user base, according to Apple.

— USA Today

This conflicts with statistics from IDC that say the tablet market contracted by 10% in 2015 with only Huawei, ranked fifth, with big gains, more than doubling their share; for fourth quarter 2015, the five biggest vendors were the same except that Amazon Fire tablets ranked third worldwide, new on the list, enabled by its not quite tripling of market share to 7.9%, with its Fire OS Android-derivative.

Global tablet shipments (Note: "Shipments refer to sell-in", that is, wholesale.)
Source	Year	Android	iOS/iPadOS	Windows	Others
Strategy Analytics	Q2 2022	49%	38%	11%	2%
Statista	2020	59.4%	29.8%	10.21%	0.59%
Strategy Analytics	2015	68%	22%	10%	<0.1%
Gartner	2013	61.9%	36.0%	2.1%	<0.1%
Gartner	2012	45.8%	52.8%	1.0%	0.3%

Gartner excludes some devices from their tablet shipment statistic and includes them in a different category called "premium ultramobiles" with screen sizes of more than 10" inches. In contrast, IDC uses five device groups within the umbrella 'Personal Computing Devices' or PCD, of them 'Detachable Tablets' and 'Slate Tablets' are included in their 'tablet' statistics, while the other three groups 'Desktop', 'Notebook' and 'Workstation' devices are included in their 'PC shipment' numbers.

=== Smartphone shipments ===
There are more mobile phone owners than toothbrush owners, with mobile phones the fastest growing technology in history. There are a billion more active mobile phones in the world than people (and many more than 10 billion sold so far with less than half still in use), explained by the fact that some people have more than one, such as an extra for work. All the phones have an operating system, but not all of them are smartphones with an OS capable of running modern applications. In 2018, 3.1 billion smartphones and tablets were in use across the world (with tablets, a small fraction of the total, generally running the same operating systems, Android or iOS, the latter being more popular on tablets. In 2019, a variant of iOS called iPadOS built for iPad tablets was released).

On 28 May 2015, Google announced that there were 1.4 billion Android users and 1 billion Google play users active during that month. This changed to 2 billion monthly active users in May 2017.

By late 2016, Android had been said to be "killing" Apple's iOS market share (i.e. its declining sales of smartphones, not just relatively but also by number of units, when the whole market was increasing). Gartner's press release stated: "Apple continued its downward trend with a decline of 7.7 percent in the second quarter of 2016", which is their decline, based on absolute number of units, that underestimates the relative decline (with the market increasing), along with the misleading "1.7 percent [point]" decline. That point decline means an 11.6% relative decline (from 14.6% down to 12.9%).

Although by units sold Apple was declining in the late 2010s, the company was almost the only vendor making any profit in the smartphone sector from hardware sales alone. In Q3 2016 for example, they captured 103.6% of the market profits.

In May 2019, the biggest smartphone companies (by market share) were Samsung, Huawei and Apple, respectively.

In November 2024, a new competitor to Android and iOS emerged, when sales of the Huawei Mate 70 started with the all-new operating system HarmonyOS NEXT installed on the flagship device. Since 2025 all new Huawei devices have exclusively been sold with the HarmonyOS NEXT operating system, creating a third player on the market for smartphone operating systems.

In the first quarter of 2025, Huawei, which at that time almost exclusively sold smartphones with its HarmonyOS NEXT operating system, overtook Chinese company Xiaomi to become the best-selling smartphone brand in China, with a 19 per cent market share.

Rising RAM prices at the end of 2025 caused Gartner to predict reduction in both PC and smartphone sales. That prediction was proven right for the first quarter of 2026.

The following table shows worldwide smartphone sales to end users by operating systems, as measured by Counterpoint marketing agency:

Smartphone shipments by OS since 2023
Source	Method	Year/quarter	Android (including forks)	HarmonyOS NEXT (including Harmony OS)	iOS	Others
Counterpoint	Units sold per quarter	2025 Q4	72%	3%	24%	0%
Counterpoint	Units sold per quarter	2025 Q3	79%	4%	17%	0%
Counterpoint	Units sold per quarter	2025 Q2	79%	4%	17%	0%
Counterpoint	Units sold per quarter	2025 Q1	76%	5%	19%	0%
Counterpoint	Units sold per quarter	2024 Q4	74%	4%	22%	0%
Counterpoint	Units sold per quarter	2024 Q3	80%	4%	16%	0%
Counterpoint	Units sold per quarter	2024 Q2	80%	4%	16%	0%
Counterpoint	Units sold per quarter	2024 Q1	77%	4%	19%	0%
Counterpoint	Units sold per quarter	2023 Q4	74%	3%	23%	0%

The following table shows worldwide smartphone sales to end users by operating systems, as measured by Gartner:

Smartphone shipments by OS from 2017 to 2023 (Windows and BlackBerry no longer measurable)
Source	Method	Year/quarter	Android (including forks)	iOS	Others
Gartner	Units sold per year	2021	84.3%	16.7%	0.0%
Gartner	Units sold in quarter	2021 Q4	88.1%	21.9%	0%
Gartner	Units sold in quarter	2021 Q3	85.8%	14.2%	0%
Gartner	Units sold in quarter	2021 Q2	85.0%	15.0%	0%
Gartner	Units sold in quarter	2021 Q1	84.5%	15.5%	0%
Gartner	Units sold per year	2020	85.2%	14.8%	0.0%
Gartner	Units sold in quarter	2020 Q4	79.2%	20.8%	0.0%
Gartner	Units sold in quarter	2020 Q3	88.9%	11.1%	0.0%
Gartner	Units sold in quarter	2020 Q2	87.1%	12.9%	0%
Gartner	Units sold in quarter	2020 Q1	86.3%	13.7%	0.0%
Gartner	Units sold per year	2019	87.4%	12.6%	0.0%
Gartner	Units sold in quarter	2019 Q4	82.9%	17.1%	0.0%
Gartner	Units sold in quarter	2019 Q3	89.5%	10.5%	0.0%
Gartner	Units sold in quarter	2019 Q2	89.5%	10.5%	0.0%
Gartner	Units sold in quarter	2019 Q1	88.1%	11.9%	0.0%
Gartner	Units sold per year	2018	86.6%	13.4%	0.0%
Gartner	Units sold in quarter	2018 Q4	84.2%	15.8%	0.0%
Gartner	Units sold in quarter	2018 Q2	88.1%	11.9%	0.0%
Gartner	Units sold in quarter	2018 Q1	85.9%	14.1%	0.0%
Gartner	Units sold per year	2017	85.9%	14.0%	0.1%
Gartner	Units sold in quarter	2017 Q1	86.1%	13.7%	0.2%

The following table shows worldwide smartphone sales to end users by operating systems, as measured by Gartner, International Data Corporation (IDG) and others:

Smartphone shipments by OS until 2016 (including Windows and BlackBerry)
Source	Method	Year/quarter	Android (including forks)	BlackBerry (all versions)	iOS	Symbian	Windows (all versions)	Others
Gartner	Units sold per year	2016	84.8%	—N/a	14.4%	—N/a	—N/a	0.8%
Gartner	Units sold in quarter	2016 Q4	81.7%	0.0%	17.9%	—N/a	0.3%	0.1%
Gartner	Units sold in quarter	2016 Q3	87.8%	0.1%	11.5%	—N/a	0.4%	0.2%
Gartner	Units sold in quarter	2016 Q2	86.2%	0.1%	12.9%	—N/a	0.6%	0.2%
Gartner	Units sold in quarter	2016 Q1	84.1%	0.2%	14.8%	—N/a	0.7%	0.2%
Gartner	Units sold in quarter	2015 Q4	80.7%	0.2%	17.7%	—N/a	1.1%	0.2%
Gartner	Units sold in quarter	2015 Q2	82.2%	0.3%	14.6%	—N/a	2.5%	0.4%
Gartner	Units sold in quarter	2014 Q4	76.0%	0.5%	20.4%	—N/a	2.8%	0.4%
Strategy Analytics	Units shipped in quarter	2014 Q3	81.3%	1.0%	13.4%	—N/a	4.1%	0.2%
Gartner	Units sold in quarter	2014 Q2	83.8%	0.7%	12.2%	—N/a	2.8%	0.5%
Gartner	Units sold in quarter	2013 Q2	79.0%	2.7%	14.2%	0.3%	3.3%	0.6%
Gartner	Units sold in quarter	2013 Q1	74.4%	3.0%	18.2%	0.6%	2.9%	1.0%
International Data Corporation	Units shipped in quarter	2013 Q1	75.0%	2.9%	17.3%	0.6%	3.2%	0.0%

The following graphic presents the marketshare shifts between 2007 and 108, based on the data tables above.

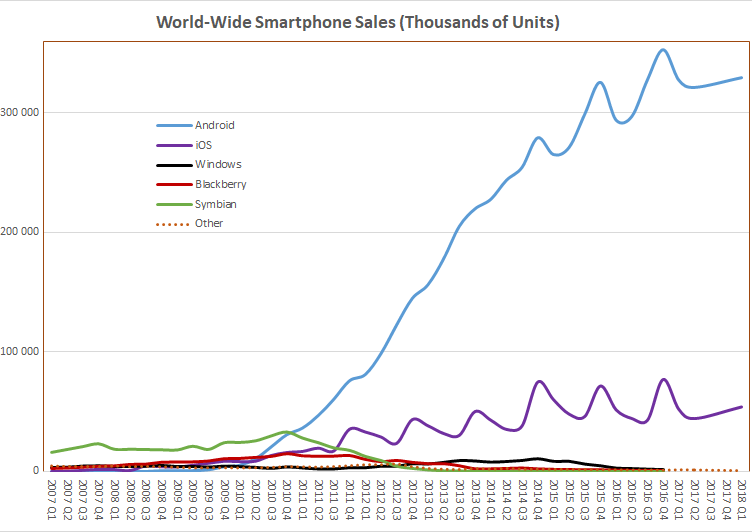

== Web clients ==
Web clients' OS family statistics in 2025
Android	38.89%
Windows	30.07%
iOS	15.63%
Unknown	7.29%
macOS	5.64%
Other	2.48%
Web clients' OS family market share according to StatCounter for December 2025. The information on web clients is obtained from user agent information obtained through JavaScript code run by web browsers supplied to web servers. StatCounter's OS X and macOS numbers are combined as macOS. Percentages may not add up to 100% due to rounding. "Unknown" is probably mostly Windows operating systems. These figures have a large margin of error for a variety of reasons. For a discussion on the shortcomings see usage share of web browsers.

Data from various sources published over the 2021/2022 period is summarized in the table below. All of these sources monitor a substantial number of websites, any statistics that relate to only one web site have been excluded.

Android currently ranks highest, above Windows (incl. Xbox console) systems. Windows Phone accounted for 0.51% of the web usage, before it was discontinued.

Considering all personal computers, Microsoft Windows is well below 50% usage share on every continent, and at 30% in the US (24% single-day low) and in many countries lower, e.g. China, and in India at 19% (12% some days) and Windows' lowest share globally was 29% in May 2022 (25% some days), and 29% in the US.

For a short time, iOS was slightly more popular than Windows in the US, but this is no longer the case. Worldwide, Android holds 45.49%, more than Windows at 25.35%, and iOS third at 18.26%.

In Africa, Android is at 53.17%, Windows is 21.53 (and iOS third at 9.71%).

Before iOS became the most popular operating system in any independent country, it was most popular in Guam, an unincorporated territory of the United States, for four consecutive quarters in 2017–18, although Android is now the most popular there. iOS has been the highest ranked OS in Jersey (a British Crown dependency in Europe) for years, by a wide margin, and iOS was also highest ranked in Falkland Islands, a British Overseas Territory, for one quarter in 2019, before being overtaken by Android in the following quarter. iOS is competitive with Windows in Sweden, where some days it is more used.

The designation of an "Unknown" operating system is strangely high in a few countries such as Madagascar where it was at 32.44% (no longer near as high). This may be due to the fact that StatCounter uses browser detection to get OS statistics, and there the most common browsers are not often used. The version breakdown for browsers in Madagascar shows "Other" at 34.9%, and Opera Mini 4.4 is the most popular known browser at 22.1% (plus e.g. 3.34% for Opera 7.6). However browser statistics without version-breakdown has Opera at 48.11% with the "Other" category very small.

In China, Android became the highest ranked operating system in July 2016 (Windows has occasionally topped it since then, while since April 2016 it or all non-mobile operating systems have not outranked mobile operating systems, meaning Android plus iOS). In the Asian continent as a whole, Android has been ranked highest since February 2016 and Android alone has the majority share, because of a large majority in all the most populous countries of the continent, up to 84% in Bangladesh, where it has had over 70% share for over four years. Since August 2015, Android is ranked first, at 48.36% in May 2016, in the African continent – when it took a big jump ahead of Windows 7, and thereby Africa joined Asia as a mobile-majority continent. China is no longer a desktop-majority country, joining India, which has a mobile-majority of 71%, confirming Asia's significant mobile-majority.

Online usage of Linux kernel derivatives (Android + ChromeOS + other Linux) exceeds that of Windows. This has been true since some time between January and April 2016, according to W3Counter and StatCounter. However, even before that, the figure for all Unix-like OSes, including those from Apple, was higher than that for Windows.

Source	Date	Microsoft Windows (kernel): ▲							Apple Darwin: ▲		Linux kernel: ▼			Others (Note: The 'Others' column is obtained by summing all percentage data and subtracting from 100%.)
Source	Date	10	8/8.1	7	Vista	XP	WP&RT	Other	macOS	iOS	Linux	Android	Other	Others
W3Counter	Oct 2025	▲31.49%	—N/a	▲7.37%	—N/a	—N/a	—N/a	—N/a	▼7.98%	▲14.70%	▼2.51%	▼25.66%	—N/a	▼10.29%
W3Counter	Sept 2025	▲29.01%	—N/a	—N/a	—N/a	—N/a	—N/a	—N/a	▲9.18%	▲13.35%	▲2.85%	▼33.51%	—N/a	▼12.1%
W3Counter	Feb 2025	▼20.95%	—N/a	—N/a	—N/a	—N/a	—N/a	—N/a	▲4.45%	▼11.71%	▼2.56%	▼43.09%	—N/a	▲16.24%
W3Counter	Dec 2024	▲22.28%	—N/a	—N/a	—N/a	—N/a	—N/a	—N/a	▼3.34%	▼13.73%	2.71%	▲46.42%	—N/a	11.52%
W3Counter	Oct 2022	▼19.23%	—N/a	▼3.4%	—N/a	—N/a	—N/a	—N/a	▼4.03%	▲19.23%	—N/a	▲45.18%	—N/a	—N/a
W3Counter	Oct 2020	▲20.55%	—N/a	6.74%	—N/a	—N/a	—N/a	—N/a	▲8.06%	▲13.67%	—N/a	▼37.44%	—N/a	—N/a
W3Counter	Jun 2019	▲16.23%	—N/a	▲14.32%	—N/a	—N/a	—N/a	—N/a	▲3.58%	▲13.54%	—N/a	▼38.76%	—N/a	—N/a
W3Counter	Jun 2018	11.14%	—N/a	12.29%	—N/a	—N/a	—N/a	—N/a	2.80%	10.68%	—N/a	53.21%	—N/a	—N/a
W3Counter	Dec 2016	13.79%	4.54%	18.45%	—N/a	—N/a	—N/a	—N/a	4.45%	12.60%	3.8%	34.37%	—N/a	8%
StatCounter Global Stats	Mar 2017	12.98%	4.57%	17.84%	0.41%	2.07%	0%	0.06%	5.17%	13.09%	0.75%	37.93%	0.76%	7.21%
StatCounter Global Stats	Dec 2016	12.5%	4.79%	18%	0.46%	2.24%	0.64%	0.09%	4.92%	12.71%	0.86%	37.8%	0.72%	4.61%
StatCounter Global Stats	Oct 2016	12.08%	5.21%	18.97%	0.6%	2.44%	0.7%	0.05%	5.3%	12.04%	0.85%	34.46%	0.63%	6.67%
StatCounter Global Stats	May 2016	10.27%	6.68%	22.25%	0.73%	3.44%	0.83%	0.8%	5.05%	11.38%	0.91%	31.6%	0.64%	6.15%
StatCounter Global Stats	Dec 2015	6.67%	8.5%	26.66%	1.0%	4.75%	0.92%	0.2%	5.51%	10.82%	1.03%	27.01%	0.36%	6.57%
Wikimedia	Dec 2016	14.0%	4.65%	18.0%	0.43%	1.70%	0.93%	0.50%	5.4%	19.0%	0.80%	23.0%	0.30%	11.29%

== Desktop and laptop computers ==
Desktop/laptop operating system browse statistics
Windows	66.47%
Unknown	15.98%
macOS	12.46%
Linux (excluding ChromeOS)	3.86%
ChromeOS	1.23%
Other	0%
Desktop OS market share according to StatCounter as of December 2025. ChromeOS is also based on the Linux kernel. StatCounter's OS X and macOS numbers are combined as macOS. Percentages may not add up to 100% due to rounding.

Windows is still the dominant desktop OS, but the dominance varies by region and it has gradually lost market share to other desktop operating systems (not just to mobile) with the slide very noticeable in the US, where macOS usage has more than quadrupled from Jan. 2009 to Dec. 2020 to 30.62% (i.e., in Christmas month; and 34.72% in April 2020 in the middle of COVID-19, and iOS was more popular overall that year; globally Windows lost to Android that year, as for the two years prior), with Windows down to 61.136% and ChromeOS at 5.46%, plus traditional Linux at 1.73%. As of March 2025, Windows holds 71.68% of the global desktop OS market share, macOS 15.7%, Linux (excluding ChromeOS) 4.20%, and ChromeOS 1.86%. In the US, as of March 2025, Windows has 54.38%, macOS 28.53%, Linux (excluding ChromeOS) 6.42%, and ChromeOS 8.44%.

There is little openly published information on the device shipments of desktop and laptop computers. Gartner publishes estimates, but the way the estimates are calculated is not openly published. Another source of market share of various operating systems is StatCounter basing its estimate on web use (although this may not be very accurate). Also, sales may overstate usage. Most computers are sold with a pre-installed operating system, with some users replacing that OS with a different one due to personal preference, or installing another OS alongside it and using both. Conversely, sales underestimate usage by not counting unauthorized copies. For example, in 2009, approximately 80% of software sold in China consisted of illegitimate copies. In 2007, the statistics from an automated update of IE7 for registered Windows computers differed with the observed web browser share, leading one writer to estimate that 25–35% of all Windows XP installations were unlicensed.

The usage share of Microsoft's (then latest operating system version) Windows 10 has slowly increased since July/August 2016, reaching around 27.15% (of all Windows versions, not all desktop or all operating systems) in December 2016. It eventually reached 79.79% on 5 October 2021, the same day on which its successor Windows 11 was released. In the United States, usage of Windows XP has dropped to 0.38% (of all Windows versions), and its global average to 0.59%, while in Africa it is still at 2.71%, and in Armenia it is more than 70%, as of 2017.

StatCounter web usage data of desktop or laptop operating systems varies significantly by country. For example, in 2017, macOS usage in North America was at 16.82% (17.52% in the US) whereas in Asia it was only 4.4%. As of July 2023, macOS usage has increased to 30.81% in North America (31.77% in the US) and to 9.64% in Asia.

Since mid-2020, the world uses smartphones more than desktop (including laptop) computers. For global statistics it is every day of the week. It has also happened for all individual continents (at least for some weeks, and also for the United States where the smartphone share reached 54.26% in July 2022, and also that high in 2021). The proportions do vary widely by region (more so than by the day), e.g. in Africa the smartphone share is highest at 72%, in Asia at 69% and in South America at 60%, in Europe is 49% while desktop is slightly lower, and in the United States it is at 43% and desktop at 54% (previously at 50%). On some continents, e.g. North America and the US, smartphone use may only go over 50% on weekends, since smartphones usage increases on weekends, while the smartphone share has gone up to 54% for a single day (Thanksgiving), and on average over 50% for full week.
1. Smartphones (58.0%)
2. Desktops/laptops (39.5%)
3. Tablets (2.46%)
4. Console (0.06%)

The 2024 Stack Overflow developer survey counts over 65,000 survey responses. However, usage of a particular system as a desktop or as a server was not differentiated in the survey responses. The operating system share among those identifying as professional developers was:

- Windows: 48.01%
- macOS: 30.65%
- Linux: 28.53%
- BSD: 0.50%

=== Microsoft data on Windows usage ===
In June 2016, Microsoft claimed Windows 10 had half the market share of all Windows installations in the US and UK, as quoted by BetaNews:

Microsoft's Windows trends page [shows] Windows 10 hit 50 percent in the US (51 percent in the UK, 39 percent globally), while ... Windows 7 was on 38 percent (36 percent in the UK, 46 percent globally). A big reason for the difference in numbers comes down to how they are recorded. ... actual OS usage (based on web browsing), while Microsoft records the number of devices Windows 10 is installed on. ... Microsoft also only records Windows 7, Windows 8, Windows 8.1 and Windows 10, while NetMarketShare includes both XP and Vista.

— BetaNews

=== Desktop computer games ===
Linux has gained more interest among gamers in the early 2020s, especially thanks to projects like Wine and Proton. Wine allows Windows programs to run on Linux, while Valve's Proton makes many games on Steam directly playable without any additional configuration. The Linux version of Steam and devices such as Steam Deck using Linux-based SteamOS have made Linux more accessible as a gaming platform. The number of Steam games currently available on Linux exceeds the total number of games available on Xbox, Nintendo Switch and PlayStation platforms. In addition, on modern systems, Linux is able to offer comparable or sometimes higher performance than Windows in some games due to its lower system load. These developments have made Linux a more viable alternative to Windows in terms of game playability compared to the past.

The digital video game distribution platform Steam publishes data monthly through their Hardware & Software Survey:

Steam User OS Share, 2014–2026
Month	Windows	Mac OS	Linux
October 2026	93.70%	2.35%	3.95%
September 2026	95.03%	1.92%	3.05%
August 2026	93.95%	2.14%	3.90%
July 2026	93.67%	2.32%	4.01%
June 2026	94.10%	2.21%	3.69%
May 2026	93.85%	2.16%	3.99%
April 2026	93.47%	2.01%	4.52%
March 2026	92.33%	2.35%	5.33%
February 2026	96.61%	1.16%	2.23%
January 2026	94.62%	2.01%	3.38%
December 2025	94.23%	2.18%	3.58%
December 2024	96.10%	1.61%	2.29%
December 2023	96.40%	1.63%	1.97%
December 2022	96.15%	2.48%	1.38%
December 2021	96.19%	2.70%	1.11%
December 2020	96.51%	2.74%	0.74%
December 2019	96.89%	2.47%	0.67%
January 2019	95.92%	3.27%	0.82%
January 2018	97.76%	1.84%	0.41%
January 2017	95.79%	3.31%	0.80%^{†}
January 2016	95.39%	3.55%	0.95%
January 2015	95.48%	3.32%	1.09%
January 2014 (Note: The 2014 Steam Hardware & Surveys also listed a 0.74% share of other operating systems. Future surveys did not include other operating systems.)	94.93%	3.47%	0.86%

^†The 2017 figures, as reported by Steam, do not include SteamOS statistics.

== Mobile devices ==
=== Smartphones OS by usage ===
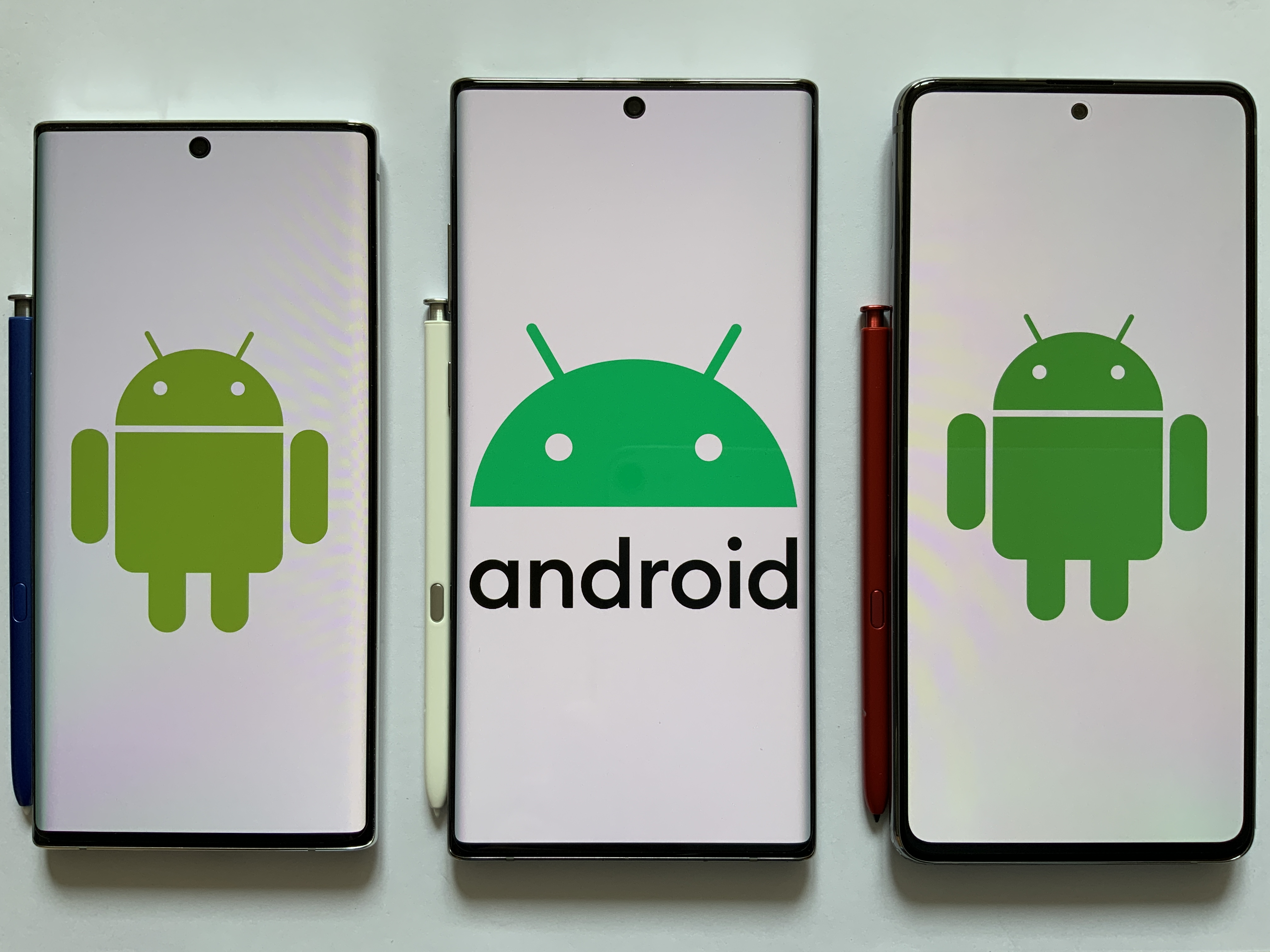
Android is the most popular mobile operating system, and is used by virtually all mobile phones, except for iPhone models, which use iOS.

By Q1 2018, mobile operating systems on smartphones included Google's dominant Android (and variants) and Apple's iOS which combined had an almost 100% market share.

Smartphone penetration vs. desktop use differs substantially by country. Some countries, like Russia, still have smartphone use as low as 22.35% (as a fraction of all web use), but in most western countries, smartphone use is close to 50% of all web use. This doesn't mean that only half of the population has a smartphone, could mean almost all have, just that other platforms have about equal use. Smartphone usage share in developing countries is much higher – in Bangladesh, for example, Android smartphones had up to 84% and currently 70% share, and in Mali smartphones had over 90% (up to 95%) share for almost two years. (A section below has more information on regional trends on the move to smartphones.)

There is a clear correlation between the GDP per capita of a country and that country's respective smartphone OS market share, with users in the richest countries being much more likely to choose Apple's iPhone, with Google's Android being predominant elsewhere.

Global mobile OS web usage (Note: Table is only showing mobile OS market share – not the overall market share.)
Source	Method	Quarter/month	Android (including forks)	iOS	Windows (all versions)	BlackBerry (all versions)	Symbian	Others
Statista	based on page views per month worldwide	2022 Q4	71.1%	28.3%	—N/a	—N/a	—N/a	0.6%
StatCounter Global Stats	Browsing (page view)	2021, Oct	71.09%	28.21%	0.01%	—N/a	—N/a	0.69%
StatCounter Global Stats	Browsing (page view)	2020, Oct	72.93%	26.53%	0.03%	—N/a	—N/a	0.51%
StatCounter Global Stats	Browsing (page view)	2019, Sep	76.24%	22.48%	0.17%	0.02%	0.02%	1.07%
StatCounter Global Stats	Browsing (page view)	2015, Mar	61.94%	22.64%	2.27%	—N/a	6.00%	7.09%
StatCounter Global Stats	Browsing (page view)	2014, Aug	54.87%	23.57%	2.36%	1.59%	9.73%	7.87%
StatCounter Global Stats	Browsing (page view)	2014, Feb	47.57%	22.97%	2.22%	2.62%	14.86%	6.08%
Wikimedia (includes tablets) (Note: Wikimedia Foundation statistics consider tablets as part of the mobile OS market share.)	Browsing (page view)	2013, Mar	25.93%	66.53%	1.85%	2.02%	3.03%	1.12%

United States mobile OS web usage
Source	Method	Quarter/month	Android (including forks)	iOS	Windows (all versions)	BlackBerry (all versions)	Symbian	Others
comScore (US only)	US subscribers	2017, Jan	52.0%	43.9%	1.5%	0.5%	—N/a	—N/a
comScore (US only)	US subscribers	2016, Jan	52.8%	43.6%	2.7%	0.8%	—N/a	—N/a
comScore (US only)	US subscribers	2015, Jan	53.2%	41.3%	3.6%	1.8%	0.1%	—N/a
comScore (US only)	US subscribers	2014, Jan	51.7%	41.6%	3.2%	3.1%	0.2%	—N/a
comScore (US only)	US subscribers	2012, Feb	50.1%	30.2%	3.9%	13.4%	1.5%	—N/a
comScore (US only)	US subscribers	2010, Dec	28.7%	25.0%	8.4%	31.6%	—N/a	3.7%

=== Tablet computers OS by usage ===
Tablet computers, or simply tablets, became a significant OS market share category starting with Apple's iPad. In Q1 2018, iOS had 65.03% market share and Android had 34.58% market share. Windows tablets may not get classified as such by some analysts, and thus barely register; e.g. 2-in-1 PCs may get classified as "desktops", not tablets.

Since 2016, in South America (and Cuba in North America), Android tablets have gained majority, and in Asia in 2017 Android was slightly more popular than the iPad, which was at 49.05% usage share in October 2015. In Africa, Android tablets are much more popular while elsewhere the iPad has a safe margin.

As of March 2015, Android has made steady gains to becoming the most popular tablet operating system: that is the trend in many countries, having already gained the majority in large countries (India at 63.25%, and in Indonesia at 62.22%) and in the African continent with Android at 62.22% (first to gain Android majority in late 2014), with steady gains from 20.98% in August 2012 (Egypt at 62.37%, Zimbabwe at 62.04%), and South America at 51.09% in July 2015. (Peru at 52.96%). Asia is at 46%. In Nepal, Android gained majority lead in November 2014 but lost it down to 41.35% with iOS at 56.51%. In Taiwan, as of October 2016, Android after having gained a confident majority, has been on a losing streak. China is a major exception to Android gaining market share in Asia (there Android phablets are much more popular than Android tablets, while similar devices get classified as smartphones) where the iPad/iOS is at 82.84% in March 2015.

As of 2025, the iPadOS and Android tablets achieved parity in usage share, as illustrated by the StatCounter Internet usage data in the following table.

Global tablet web usage
Source	Month	iOS/iPadOS	Android	Windows	Others
StatCounter	Oct 2025	50.95%	48.88%	0.01%	0.17%
StatCounter	May 2025	49.94%	49.78%	0.01%	0.27%
StatCounter	Aug 2023	54.68%	45.11%	0.02%	0.07%
StatCounter	Oct 2020	58.86%	41.02%	0.08%	0.04%
StatCounter	Dec 2019	63.11%	36.65%	0.15%	0.09%
StatCounter	Jul 2018	65.03%	34.58%	0.21%	0.18%
StatCounter	Jul 2015	65.51%	31.36%	0.78%	2.93%
StatCounter	Feb 2015	66.47%	29.60%	1.16%	2.73%
StatCounter	Oct 2014	71.67%	25.62%	0.08%	2.63%

=== Crossover to smartphones having majority share ===
According to StatCounter web use statistics (a proxy for all use), smartphones are more popular than desktop computers globally (and Android in particular more popular than Windows). Including tablets with mobiles/smartphones, as they also run so-called mobile operating systems, even in the United States (and most countries) are mobiles including tablets more popular than other (older originally made for desktops) operating systems (such as Windows and macOS). Windows in the US (at 33.42%) has only 8% head-start (2.55-percentage points) over iOS only; with Android, that mobile operating system and iOS have 52.14% majority. Alternatively, Apple, with iOS plus their non-mobile macOS (9.33%) has 20% more share (6.7-percentage points more) than Microsoft's Windows in the country where both companies were built.

Although desktop computers are still popular in many countries (while overall down to 44.9% in the first quarter of 2017), smartphones are more popular even in many developed countries. A few countries on all continents are desktop-minority with Android more popular than Windows; many, e.g. Poland in Europe, and about half of the countries in South America, and many in North America, e.g. Guatemala, Honduras, Haiti; up to most countries in Asia and Africa with smartphone-majority because of Android, Poland and Turkey in Europe highest with 57.68% and 62.33%, respectively. In Ireland, smartphone use at 45.55% outnumbers desktop use and mobile as a whole gains majority when including the tablet share at 9.12%. Spain was also slightly desktop-minority. As of July 2019, Sweden had been desktop-minority for eight weeks in a row.

The range of measured mobile web use varies a lot by country, and a StatCounter press release recognizes "India amongst world leaders in use of mobile to surf the internet" (of the big countries) where the share is around (or over) 80% and desktop is at 19.56%, with Russia trailing with 17.8% mobile use (and desktop the rest).

Smartphones (discounting tablets), first gained majority in December 2016 (desktop-majority was lost the month before), and it wasn't a Christmas-time fluke, as while close to majority after smartphone majority happened again in March 2017.

In the week of 7–13 November 2016, smartphones alone (without tablets) overtook desktop for the first time, albeit for a short period. Examples of mobile-majority countries include Paraguay in South America, Poland in Europe and Turkey and most of Asia and Africa. Some of the world is still desktop-majority, with for example the United States at 54.89% (but not on all days). However, in some territories of the United States, such as Puerto Rico, desktop is significantly under majority, with Windows just under 25%, overtaken by Android.

On 22 October 2016 (and subsequent weekends), mobile showed majority. Since 27 October, the desktop hasn't had a majority, including on weekdays. Smartphones alone have shown majority since 23 December to the end of the year, with the share topping at 58.22% on Christmas Day. To the "mobile"-majority share of smartphones, tablets could be added giving a 63.22% majority. While an unusually high top, a similar high also occurred on Monday 17 April 2017, with the smartphone share slightly lower and tablet share slightly higher, combining to 62.88%.

Formerly, according to a StatCounter press release, the world has turned desktop-minority; as of October 2016, at about 49% desktop use for that month, but mobile wasn't ranked higher, tablet share had to be added to it to exceed desktop share.

For the Christmas season (i.e. temporarily, while desktop-minority remains and smartphone-majority on weekends), the last two weeks in December 2016, Australia (and Oceania in general) was desktop-minority for the first time for an extended period, i.e. every day from 23 December.

In South America, smartphones alone took majority from desktops on Christmas Day, but for a full-week-average, desktop is still at least at 58%.

The UK desktop-minority dropped down to 44.02% on Christmas Day and for the eight days to the end of the year. Ireland joined some other European countries with smartphone-majority, for three days after Christmas, topping that day at 55.39%.

In the US, desktop-minority happened for three days on and around Christmas (while a longer four-day stretch happened in November, and happens frequently on weekends).

According to StatCounter web use statistics (a proxy for all use), in the week from 7–13 November 2016, "mobile" (meaning smartphones) alone (without tablets) overtook desktop, for the first time, with them highest ranked at 52.13% (on 27 November 2016) or up to 49.02% for a full week. Mobile-majority applies to countries such as Paraguay in South America, Poland in Europe and Turkey; and the continents Asia and Africa. Large regions of the rest of the world are still desktop-majority, while on some days, the United States, (and North America as a whole) isn't; the US is desktop-minority up to four days in a row, and up to a five-day average. Other examples, of desktop-minority on some days, include the UK, Ireland, Australia (and Oceania as a whole); in fact, at least one country on every continent has turned desktop-minority (for at least a month). On 22 October 2016 (and subsequent weekends), mobile has shown majority.

Previously, according to a StatCounter press release, the world has turned desktop-minority; as of October 2016, at about 49% desktop use for that month, with desktop-minority stretching up to an 18-weeks/4-months period from 28 June to 31 October 2016, while whole of July, August or September 2016, showed desktop-majority (and many other long sub-periods in the long stretch showed desktop-minority; similarly only Fridays, Saturdays and Sundays are desktop-minority). The biggest continents, Asia and Africa, have shown vast mobile-majority for long time (any day of the week), as well as several individual countries elsewhere have also turned mobile-majority: Poland, Albania (and Turkey) in Europe and Paraguay and Bolivia in South America.

According to StatCounter's web use statistics, Saturday, 28 May 2016, was the day when smartphones ("mobile" at StatCounter, that now counts tablets separately) became a most used platform, ranking first, at 47.27%, above desktops. The next day, desktops slightly outnumbered "mobile" (unless counting tablets: some analysts count tablets with smartphones or separately while others with desktops – even when most tablets are iPad or Android, not Windows devices).

Since Sunday, 27 March 2016, the first day the world dipped to desktop-minority, it has happened almost every week, and by week of 11–17 July 2016, the world was desktop-minority, followed by the next week, and thereon also for a three-week period. The trend is still stronger on weekends, with e.g. 17 July 2016 showed desktop at 44.67%, "mobile" at 49.5% plus tablets at 5.7%. Recent weekly data shows a downward trend for desktops.

According to StatCounter web use statistics (a proxy for overall use), on weekends desktops worldwide lose about 5 percent points, e.g. down to 51.46% on 15 August 2015, with the loss in (relative) web use going to mobile (and also a minuscule increase for tablets), mostly because Windows 7, ranked 1st on workdays, declines in web use, with it shifting to Android and lesser degree to iOS.

Two continents have already crossed over to mobile-majority (because of Android), based on StatCounters web use statistics. In June 2015, Asia became the first continent where mobile overtook desktop (followed by Africa in August; while Nigeria had mobile majority in October 2011, because of Symbian – that later had 51% share, then Series 40 dominating, followed by Android as dominating operating system) and as far back as October 2014, they had reported this trend on a large scale in a press release: "Mobile usage has already overtaken desktop in several countries including India, South Africa and Saudi Arabia". In India, desktop went from majority, in July 2012, down to 32%. In Bangladesh desktop went from majority, in May 2013, down to 17%, with Android alone now accounting for majority web use. Only a few African countries were still desktop-majority and many have a large mobile majority including Ethiopia and Kenya, where mobile usage is over 72%.

The popularity of mobile use worldwide has been driven by the huge popularity increase of Android in Asian countries, where Android is the highest ranked operating system statistically in virtually every south-east Asian country, while it also ranks most popular in almost every African country. Poland has been desktop-minority since April 2015, because of Android being vastly more popular there, and other European countries, such as Albania (and Turkey), have also crossed over. The South America continent is somewhat far from losing desktop-majority, but Paraguay had lost it as of March 2015. Android and mobile browsing in general has also become hugely popular in all other continents where desktop has a large desktop base and the trend to mobile is not as clear as a fraction of the total web use.

While some analysts count tablets with desktops (as some of them run Windows), others count them with mobile phones (as the vast majority of tablets run so-called mobile operating systems, such as Android or iOS on the iPad). iPad has a clear lead globally, but has clearly lost the majority to Android in South America, and a number of Eastern European countries such as Poland; lost virtually all African countries and has lost the majority twice in Asia, but gained the majority back (while many individual countries, e.g. India and most of the middle East have clear Android majority on tablets). Android on tablets is thus second most popular after the iPad.

In March 2015, for the first time in the US, the number of mobile-only adult internet users exceeded the number of desktop-only internet users with 11.6% of the digital population only using mobile compared to 10.6% only using desktop; this also means the majority, 78%, use both desktop and mobile to access the internet. A few smaller countries in North America, such as Haiti (because of Android) have gone mobile majority (mobile went to up to 72.35%, and is at 64.43% in February 2016).

As of May 2026, StatCounter estimated worldwide web traffic by platform at 50.29% mobile, 48.24% desktop, and 1.48% tablet.

=== Revenue ===
The region with the largest Android usage also has the largest mobile revenue.

Mobile app revenue (US$bn)
	2020
Asia Pacific	$85.3B
North and South America	$74.5B
Europe, Middle East, and Africa	$29.1B

== Public servers on the Internet ==
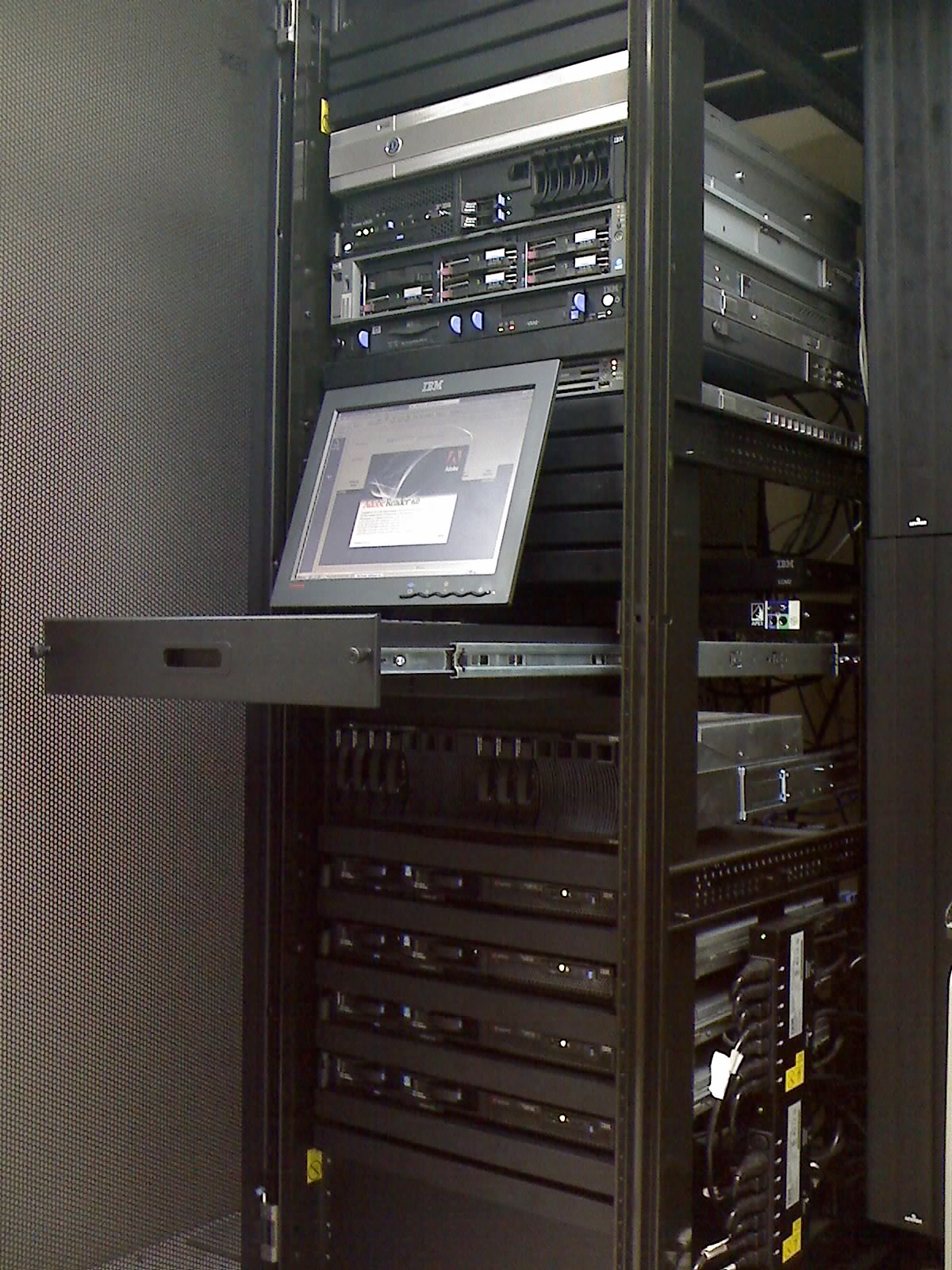
Servers in a colocation centre

Internet based servers' market share can be measured with statistical surveys of publicly accessible servers, such as web servers, mail servers or DNS servers on the Internet: the operating systems powering such servers are found by inspecting raw response messages. This method gives insight only into market share of operating systems that are publicly accessible on the Internet.

There will be differences in the result depending on how the sample is done and observations weighted. Usually the surveys are not based on a random sample of all IP addresses, domain names, hosts or organisations, but on servers found by some other method. Additionally, many domains and IP addresses may be served by one host and some domains may be served by several hosts or by one host with several IP addresses.

Source	Date	Unix, Unix-like (includes Linux)	Microsoft Windows	References
W3Techs	29 March 2025	88.8%	11.4%	
W3Techs	14 July 2022	80.1%	20.1%	
Security Space	Feb 2014	<79.3%	>20.7%	
Note W3Techs checked the top ten million web servers daily from June 2013, but W3Techs's definition of "website" differs a bit from Alexa's definition; the "top 10 million" websites are actually fewer than 10 million. W3Techs claims that these differences "have no statistical significance".

Note
Revenue comparisons often include "operating system software, other bundled software" and are not appropriate for usage comparison as the Linux operating system costs nothing (including "other bundled software"), except if optionally using commercial distributions such as Red Hat Enterprise Linux (in that case, cost of software for all software bundled with hardware has to be known for all operating systems involved, and subtracted). In cases where no-cost Linux is used, such comparisons underestimate Linux server popularity and overestimate other proprietary operating systems such as Unix and Windows.

== Mainframes ==
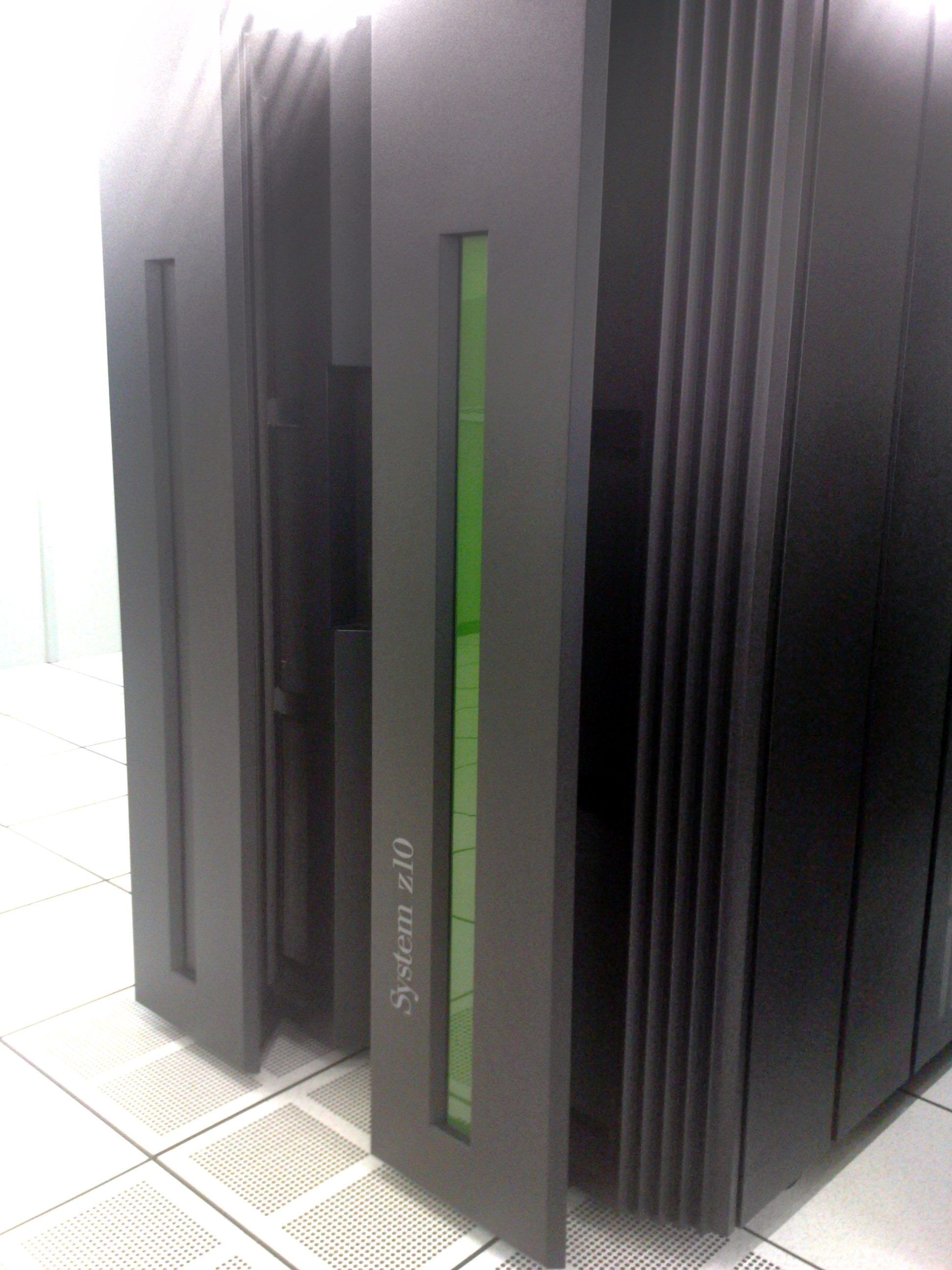
IBM's System z10

Mainframes are larger and more powerful than most servers, but not supercomputers. They are used to process large sets of data, for example enterprise resource planning or credit card transactions.

The most common operating system for mainframes is IBM's proprietary z/OS. Operating systems for IBM Z generation hardware include z/OS, Linux on IBM Z, z/TPF, VSE and z/VM.

Gartner reported on 23 December 2008 that Linux on System z was used on approximately 28% of the "customer z base" and that they expected this to increase to over 50% in the following five years. Of Linux on IBM Z, Red Hat and Micro Focus compete to sell RHEL and SLES respectively:

- Prior to 2006, Novell claimed a market share of 85% or more for SUSE Linux Enterprise Server.
- Red Hat has since claimed 18.4% in 2007 and 37% in 2008.
- Gartner reported at the end of 2008 that Novell's SUSE Linux Enterprise Server had an 80% share of mainframe Linux.

=== Decline ===
Like today's trend of mobile devices from personal computers, in 1984, for the first time, estimated sales of desktop computers ($11.6 billion) exceeded mainframe computers ($11.4 billion). IBM received the vast majority of mainframe revenue.

During the 1990s, companies found that servers based on microcomputer designs could be deployed at a fraction of the acquisition price and offer local users much greater control over their own systems given the IT policies and practices at that time. Terminals used for interacting with mainframe systems were gradually replaced by personal computers. Consequently, demand plummeted and new mainframe installations were restricted mainly to financial services and government. In the early 1990s, there was a rough consensus among industry analysts that the mainframe was a dying market as mainframe platforms were increasingly replaced by personal computer networks.

In 2012, NASA powered down its last mainframe, an IBM System z9. However, IBM's successor to the z9, the z10, led a New York Times reporter to state four years earlier that "mainframe technology—hardware, software and services—remains a large and lucrative business for IBM, and mainframes are still the back-office engines behind the world's financial markets and much of global commerce". As of 2010, while mainframe technology represented less than 3% of IBM's revenues, it "continue[d] to play an outsized role in Big Blue's results".

== Supercomputers ==
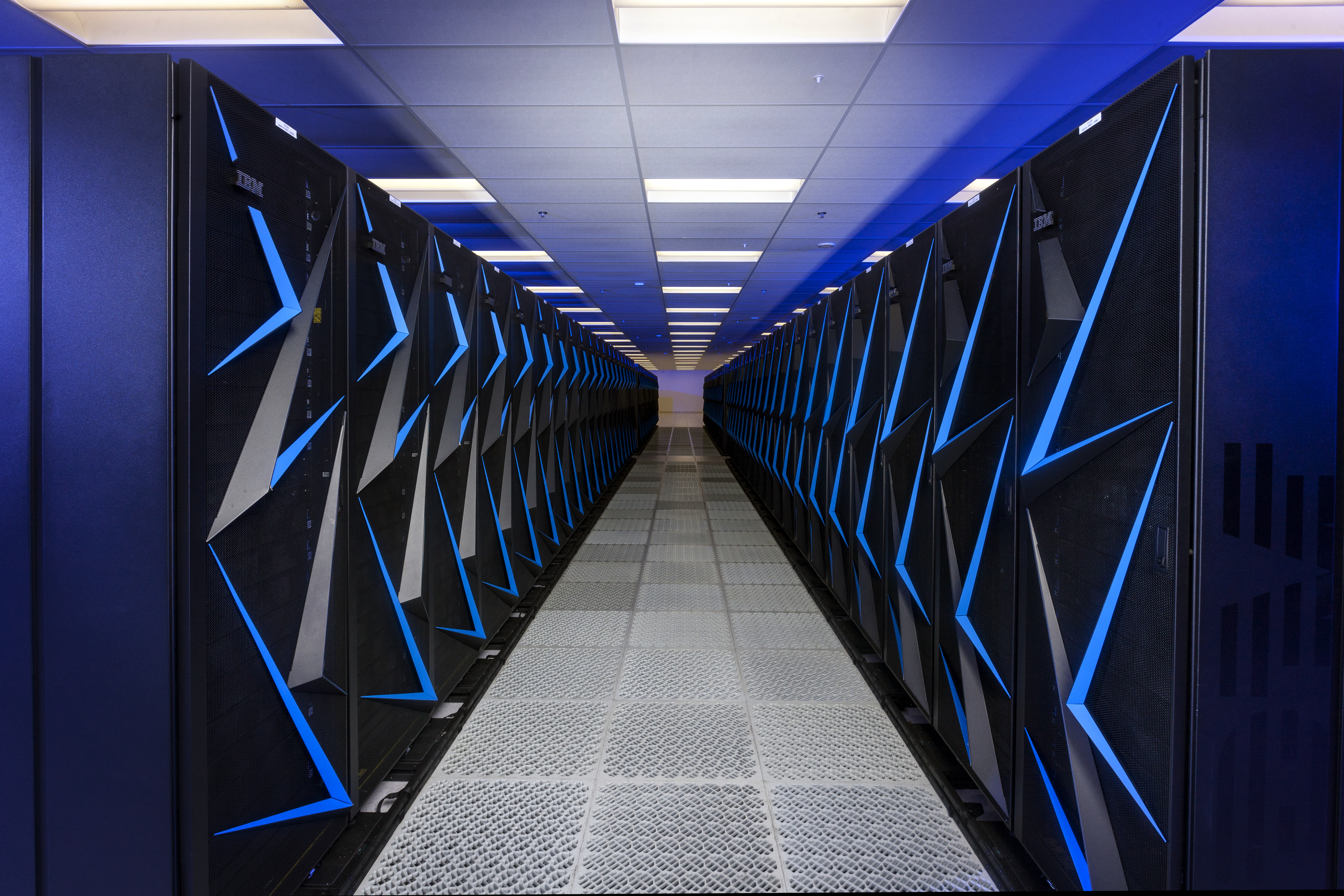
Sierra is primarily used for the stockpile stewardship program of the United States.

The TOP500 project lists and ranks the 500 fastest supercomputers for which benchmark results are submitted. Since the early 1990s, the field of supercomputers has been dominated by Unix or Unix-like operating systems, and starting in 2017, every top 500 fastest supercomputer uses Linux as its supercomputer operating system.

The last supercomputer to rank No. 1 while using an operating system other than Linux was ASCI White, which ran AIX. It held the title from November 2000 to November 2001, and was decommissioned in 2006. Then in June 2017, two AIX computers held rank 493 and 494, the last non-Linux systems before they dropped off the list.

Supercomputer OS family – 1993–2021 systems share according to TOP500

Historically, all kinds of Unix operating systems dominated, and in the end ultimately Linux remains.

== Market share by category ==
Category	Source	Date	Linux	UNIX and Unix-like other than Linux	Windows	In‑house	Other
Desktop, laptop	StatCounter Global Stats	May 2025	4.04% (Linux) + 1.84% (ChromeOS) = 5.88%	13.54% (macOS)	70.31%	—	10.27% (unknown/other)
Embedded (Note: Embedded is a vast category, with subcategories like automotive, avionics, medical, consumer, telecom, etc. Stats vary by subcategory.)	EE Times	Mar 2019	38.42% (Embedded Linux, Android)	2.82% (QNX, LynxOS)	10.73% (Windows Embedded)	10.73%	37.30%
Mainframe	Gartner	Dec 2008	28% (SLES, RHEL)	—	—	72% (z/OS (Note: z/OS includes a UNIX environment alongside its native OS heritage.))	—
Server (web)	W3Techs	Sep 2024	~77% (Linux, Unix-like)	<1% (BSD, Darwin, etc.)	~22% (Windows Server)	—	—
Smartphone, Tablet	StatCounter Global Stats	May 2025	72.72% (Android)	26.92% (iOS)	—	—	0.36% (KaiOS, others)
Supercomputer	TOP500	Nov 2024	100% (Linux)	—	—	—	—

== See also ==
- Comparison of operating systems
- List of operating systems
- Timeline of operating systems
- Usage share of web browsers
- Mobile OS market share
