= StatCounter =

Company that analyzes web traffic

Statcounter

- Screenshot Screenshot of section of website
- Website type: Web traffic analysis
- Owner: Aodhán Cullen
- Creator: Aodhán Cullen
- Website: statcounter.com gs.statcounter.com
- Commercial: Yes
- Registration: Not required for basic access
- Launched: 1999; 27 years ago
- Current status: Active

StatCounter is an Irish web traffic analysis website started in 1999. Access to basic services is free to use and advanced services can cost between US$5 and US$119 a month. StatCounter is based in Dublin, Ireland. The statistics from StatCounter are used to compute web usage share for example. As of October 2026, StatCounter is used on 0.3% of all websites, down from 0.9% in May 2019.

StatCounter statistics are directly derived from hits—as opposed to unique visitors—from 3 million sites, which use StatCounter, resulting in total hits of more than 15 billion per month. No artificial weightings are used to correct for sampling bias, thus the numbers in the statistics can not be considered to be representative samples.

The company was founded by Aodhán Cullen at the age of 16. Cullen received the "Internet Hero" award at the 2008 Eircom Golden Spider Awards. He was also named the 2007 BusinessWeek "Young European Entrepreneur of the Year".
