= Market share =

Relative market adoption

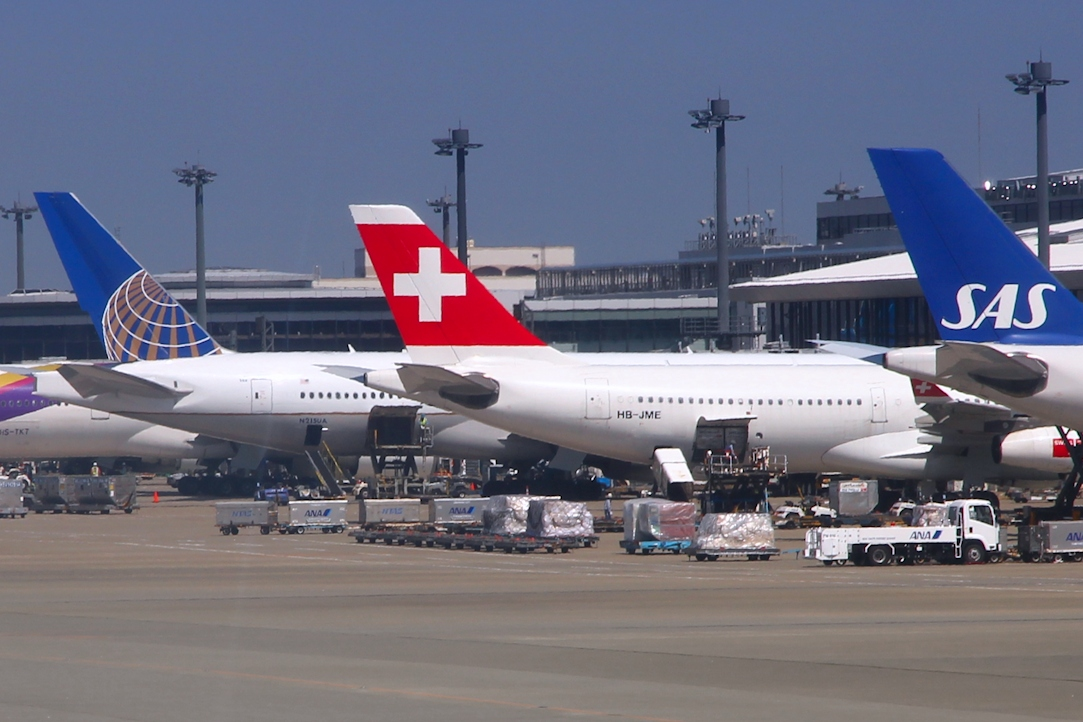
Airlines competing for market share of Europe-Japan revenue flight market: Swiss and SAS

Market share is the percentage of the total revenue or sales in a market that a company's business makes up. For example, if there are 50,000 units sold per year in a given industry, a company whose sales were 5,000 of those units would have a 10 percent share in that market.

"Marketers need to be able to translate sales targets into market share because this will demonstrate whether forecasts are to be attained by growing with the market or by capturing share from competitors. The latter will almost always be more difficult to achieve. Market share is closely monitored for signs of change in the competitive landscape, and it frequently drives strategic or tactical action." Additionally, market share is a key metric in understanding performance relative to the growth of the market as measurement of internal sales growth (or decline) only may be a result of similar growth or declines in the industry being measured.

Increasing market share is one of the most important objectives of business. The main advantage of using market share as a measure of business performance is that it is less dependent upon macro environmental variables such as the state of the economy or changes in tax policy.

In the United States market, however, increasing market share may be dangerous for makers of fungible and potentially hazardous products such as medicine, due to a US-only legal doctrine called market share liability.

== Purpose ==
Market share is said to be a key indicator of market competitiveness, i.e. how well a firm is doing against its competitors. "This metric, supplemented by changes in sales revenue, helps managers evaluate both primary and selective demand in their market. That is, it enables them to judge not only total market growth or decline but also trends in customers' selections among competitors. Generally, sales growth resulting from primary demand (total market growth) is less costly and more profitable than that achieved by capturing share from competitors. Conversely, losses in market share can signal serious long-term problems that require strategic adjustments. Firms with market shares below a certain level may not be viable. Similarly, within a firm's product line, market share trends for individual products are considered early indicators of future opportunities or problems." Also,"Market share competition drives companies to support climate change policies with a view to imposing costs on domestic competitors". Research has also shown that market share is a desired asset among competing firms. Experts, however, discourage making market share an objective and criterion upon which to base economic policies. The aforementioned usage of market share as a basis for gauging the performance of competing firms has fostered a system in which firms make decisions with regard to their operation with careful consideration of the impact of each decision on the market share of their competitors.

It is generally necessary to commission market research (generally desk/secondary research) to determine. Sometimes, though, one can use primary research to estimate the total market size and a company's market share.

== Types of measure ==
While "market share" may be defined as "the percentage of a market accounted for by a specific entity", the measure may also be divided into two types:

"Unit market share: The units sold by a particular company as a percentage of total market sales, measured in the same units."

Unit market share (%) = 100 * Unit sales (#) / Total Market Unit Sales (#)

"This formula, of course, can be rearranged to derive either unit sales or total market unit sales from the other two variables, as illustrated in the following:"

Unit sales (#) = Unit market share (%) * Total Market Unit Sales (#) / 100

Total Market Unit Sales (#) = 100 * Unit sales (#) / Unit market share (%)

"Revenue market share: Revenue market share differs from unit market share in that it reflects the prices at which goods are sold. In fact, a relatively simple way to calculate relative price is to divide revenue market share by unit market share."

Revenue market share (%) = 100

Sales Revenue ($) / Total Market Sales Revenue($)

"As with the unit market share, this equation for revenue market share can be rearranged to calculate either sales revenue or total market sales revenue from the other two variables."

In a 2010 survey of nearly 200 senior marketing managers, 67% responded that they found the revenue or "dollar market share" metric very useful, while 61% found "unit market share" very useful.

Market share can also be broken down into three components, namely penetration share, share of customer, and usage index. These three underlying metrics can then be used to help the brand identify market share growth opportunities.

== Methodologies ==
"Although market share is likely the single most important marketing metric, there is no generally acknowledged best method for calculating it. This is unfortunate, as different methods may yield not only different computations of market share at a given moment, but also widely divergent trends over time. The reasons for these disparities include variations in the lenses through which share is viewed (units versus dollars), where in the channel the measurements are taken (shipments from manufacturers versus consumer purchases), market definition (scope of the competitive universe), and measurement error."

It is generally accepted that no single source will provide a fully comprehensive market share, as most methods of calculation are incomplete. Methods such as POS aggregation may omit specific retailers or brands from the calculation, while methods such as collecting consumer data may rely on recall or collecting data from a representative sample. The best method of market share calculation depends on the industry and the methods available.

== See also ==
- Usage share (disambiguation)
- Market value
- Market power
- Market share analysis
