= List of web browser performance tests =

Type of computer benchmark

There are a variety of software performance tests for web browsers, which measure rendering and animation, DOM transformations, string operations, mathematical calculations, sorting algorithms, graphic performance tests and memory instructions. Browser speed tests have been used during browser wars to prove superiority of specific web browsers.

== List ==
=== Speedometer ===
Speedometer was originally developed by the WebKit team at Apple and released in 2014 and was updated in 2018. Speedometer 3.1 tests a browser's Web app responsiveness by timing simulated user interactions.

This benchmark simulates user actions for adding, completing, and removing to-do items using multiple examples in TodoMVC. Each example in TodoMVC implements the same todo application using DOM APIs in different ways. Some call DOM APIs directly from ECMAScript 5 (ES5), ECMASCript 2015 (ES6), ES6 transpiled to ES5, and Elm transpiled to ES5. Others use one of eleven popular JavaScript frameworks: React, React with Redux, Ember.js, Backbone.js, AngularJS, (new) Angular, Vue.js, jQuery, Preact, Inferno, and Flight. Many of these frameworks are used on the most popular websites in the world, such as Facebook and Twitter. The performance of these types of operations depends on the speed of the DOM APIs, the JavaScript engine, CSS style resolution, layout, and other technologies.

=== Peacekeeper ===
Peacekeeper is a platform-independent benchmark by Futuremark that tests rendering, mathematical and memory operations. It takes approx. 5 minutes for execution and tells the results of other browsers with different CPUs. Futuremark stopped maintaining Peacekeeper in July 2015. The test was taken offline in March 2018 and is no longer available.

=== Testdrive ===
Microsoft maintains a suite of performance-oriented tests, often designed to test and stress JavaScript and rendering performance. These tests are typically designed to highlight IE's performance, but are compatible with other major browsers.

=== WebXPRT ===
WebXPRT is a cross-platform browser benchmark that runs HTML5- and JavaScript-based workloads. The benchmark provides scores for six individual workloads, as well as an overall score. WebXPRT is published by the BenchmarkXPRT Development Community, which is administered by Principled Technologies, and is one of the BenchmarkXPRT benchmarks. WebXPRT 4 is the most current version of WebXPRT.

=== Wirple BMark ===
Performance test for HTML5 3D applications. It tests performance in both Canvas3D and WebGL.

=== Dromaeo (superseded by Kraken) ===
A Mozilla test suite based on SunSpider tests. It takes several minutes for execution and displays very detailed information about every single test task.

=== Kraken (active) ===
Another JavaScript test suite from Mozilla, released September 14, 2010.

=== JetStream (active) ===
A JavaScript test suite developed by Apple.

=== SunSpider (superseded) ===
SunSpider is a benchmark created by the webkit team that aims to measure JavaScript performance on tasks relevant to the current and near future use of JavaScript in the real world, such as encryption and text manipulation. The suite further attempts to be balanced and statistically sound.

Version 0.9 was released by the WebKit team in December 2007. It was well-received, and other browser developers also use it to compare the JavaScript performance of different browsers.

Version 0.9.1 was released in April 2010.

Version 1.0 was released in April 2013.

=== V8 (superseded) ===
A JavaScript test suite by Google, used to optimize the Google Chrome web browser. It does not test rendering performance. It was superseded by Google's Octane benchmark.

=== Octane (unmaintained) ===
Google's JavaScript test suite which replaces the V8 benchmark. According to Google, "Octane v.1 consists of 13 tests, 5 new ones and 8 from the original V8 Benchmark Suite." Octane v.2 supplanted v.1, consisting of "17 tests, four more than Octane v1."

As of April 12 2017, Google no longer maintains Octane.

=== GUIMark 2 ===
This tests vector, bitmap, and text rendering for both Adobe Flash and HTML5.

=== MotionMark 1.3 (active) ===
A graphics benchmark developed by Apple.

=== Acid1 ===
Acid1, originally called the Box Acid Test, is a test page for web browsers. It was developed in October 1998 and was important in establishing baseline interoperability between early web browsers, especially for the Cascading Style Sheets 1.0 specification. As with acid tests for gold which produce a quick and obvious assessment of the quality of a piece of metal, the web acid tests were designed to produce a clear indication of a browser's compliance to web standards.

=== Acid2 ===
Acid2 is a webpage that tests web browsers' functionality in displaying aspects of HTML markup, CSS 2.1 styling, PNG images, and data URIs. The test page was released on 13 April 2005 by the Web Standards Project. The Acid2 test page will be displayed correctly in any application that follows the World Wide Web Consortium and Internet Engineering Task Force specifications for these technologies. These specifications are known as web standards because they describe how technologies used on the web are expected to function.

=== Acid3 ===
The Acid3 test is a web test page from the Web Standards Project that checks a web browser's compliance with elements of various web standards, particularly the Document Object Model (DOM) and JavaScript.
