= HTML5test =

Web application for evaluating a browser's implementation of HTML5

HTML5Test.com

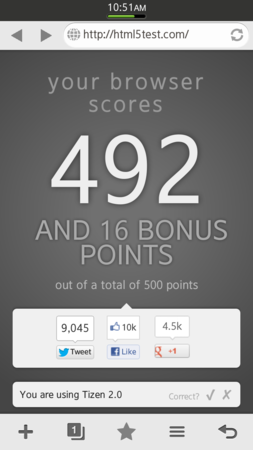
- HTML5Test.com on Tizen 2 as of 27 February 2013.
- Website type: Software testing
- Available in: English
- Owner: Niels Leenheer
- Creator: Niels Leenheer
- Website: html5test.com html5test.opensuse.org html5test.co
- Commercial: No
- Launched: 12 March 2010; 16 years ago
- Current status: Online, with a notice of outdatedness
- Content license: MIT License
- Written in: JavaScript

HTML5test.com is a discontinued web app for evaluating a web browser's implementation some of common web standards, including HTML5, Web SQL Database, Scalable Vector Graphics (SVG), and WebGL.

The test suite was developed by Dutch web programmer Niels Leenheer and published in March 2010. The app returns an integer score out of a possible 555 points. The point total has changed multiple times over the software's evolution. Leenheer introduced the present scoring system as part of a major redesign of the test introduced in November 2013. On 9 January 2024, Leenheer announced a problem with the app's server and added that he has no incentives to work on it anymore. Since then third-party derivations have been set up at html5test.co and html5test.opensuse.org.

HTML5Test.com evaluates the browser's support for Web storage, the W3C Geolocation API, HTML5-specific HTML elements (including the canvas element), and other features. It does not evaluate a browser's conformance to other web standards, such as Cascading Style Sheets, ECMAScript, or the Document Object Model. Conformance testing for those standards is within the purview of Acid3, an automated test published by Ian Hickson in 2008. Similarly, Acid3 does not evaluate a browser's HTML5 conformance. The test scope of HTML5Test.com and that of Acid3 are mutually exclusive.

Desktop browsers scores, html5test.co
Browser	Version	Score
Google Chrome	68	528
Opera	45	518
Firefox	60	497
Edge	18	496
Safari	11.2	477
Internet Explorer	11	312

== See also ==
- Acid1
- Acid2
- Acid3
