= Web Compatibility Test for Mobile Browsers =

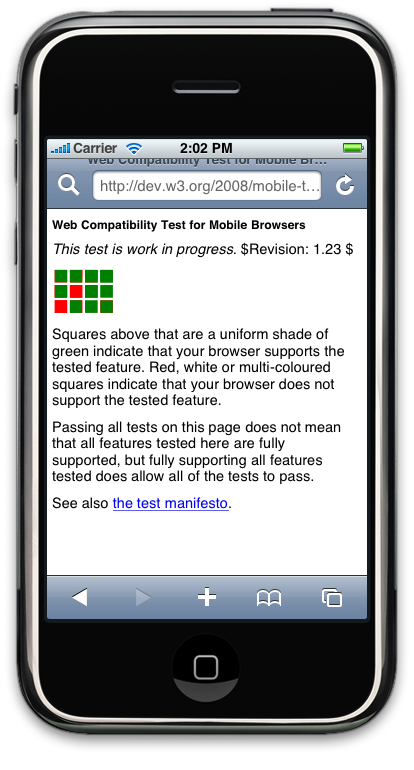
- Revision 1.23 of the Web Compatibility Test for Mobile Browsers on Safari for iOS 2
- Website type: Web standards test
- Available in: English
- Owner: The World Wide Web Consortium
- Creators: Dominique Hazael-Massieux, Wilhelm Joys Andersen, Kai Hendry
- Website: www.w3.org/2008/06/mobile-test/
- Commercial: no
- Registration: none
- Launched: 16 April 2008
- Current status: online

Web Compatibility Test for Mobile Browsers, often called the Mobile Acid test, despite not being a true Acid test, is a test page published and promoted by the World Wide Web Consortium (W3C) to expose web page rendering flaws in mobile web browsers and other applications that render HTML. It was developed in the spirit of the Acid test by the Web Standards Project to test the relevant parts that a mobile browser needs to support. The browser has to accomplish 16 different subtests indicated by a 4 x 4 image of green or red squares.

== Web Compatibility Test for Mobile Browsers – Version 2 ==
A second version of the Web Compatibility Test for Mobile Browsers was released in January 2010, this time testing HTML5 elements. The second test does not have an official explanation page, only a direct link to the test is available.

== Overview of standards tested ==
The mobile Acid test tests a variety of web standards published by the World Wide Web Consortium and the Internet Engineering Task Force. Specifically, the mobile Acid test tests:

- CSS2 min-width
- Transparent PNG
- gzip support
- HTTPS
- Cookies support
- iframe including of XHTML-served-as-XML content
- XMLHttpRequest
- Static SVG (gzipped)
- CSS Media Queries
- JavaScript framework
- Dynamic SVG
- IRIs and IDN
- DOM 'mutation' events
- The canvas element
- contenteditable
- CSS3 selectors

The second version of the test tests the following elements:

- XmlHttpRequest
- <canvas>
- contenteditable
- Geolocation
- <input type='date'>
- Appcache
- <video>
- <audio>
- Web Workers
- localStorage
- sessionStorage
- @font-face

== Passing Conditions ==
A green square indicates that the browser fully supports its assigned feature. A square colored red or a different color indicates that the feature is not fully supported. The second test shows a percentage bar indicating the percent of elements supported.

== Results ==
Due to the wide variety of web engines used at the time for mobile browsers, results varied between browsers used. Safari on iOS 3 received a 15/16 score on the first test and the Palm Pre web browser scored a 13/16 in revision 1.47 of the first test. In 2010, Firefox Mobile for Android scored a 75% while Safari scored a 67%. By 2012, versions of Chrome, Safari, and Firefox had scores of 80% or over on the second test. The most common failure on the second test was <input type='date'>, with a 61.45% failure rate.

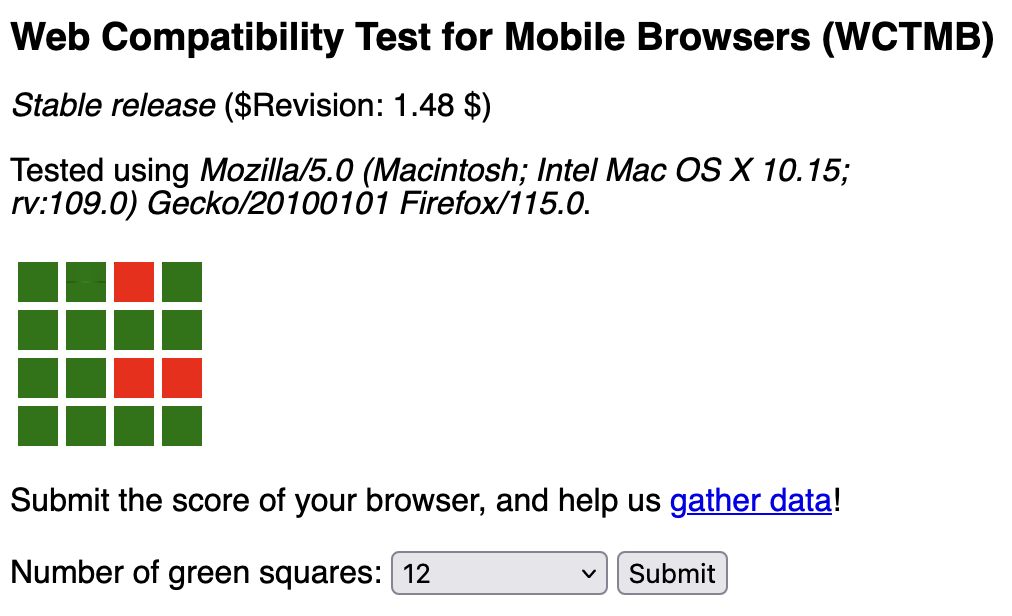
Scores for the first version of the test for Firefox 115

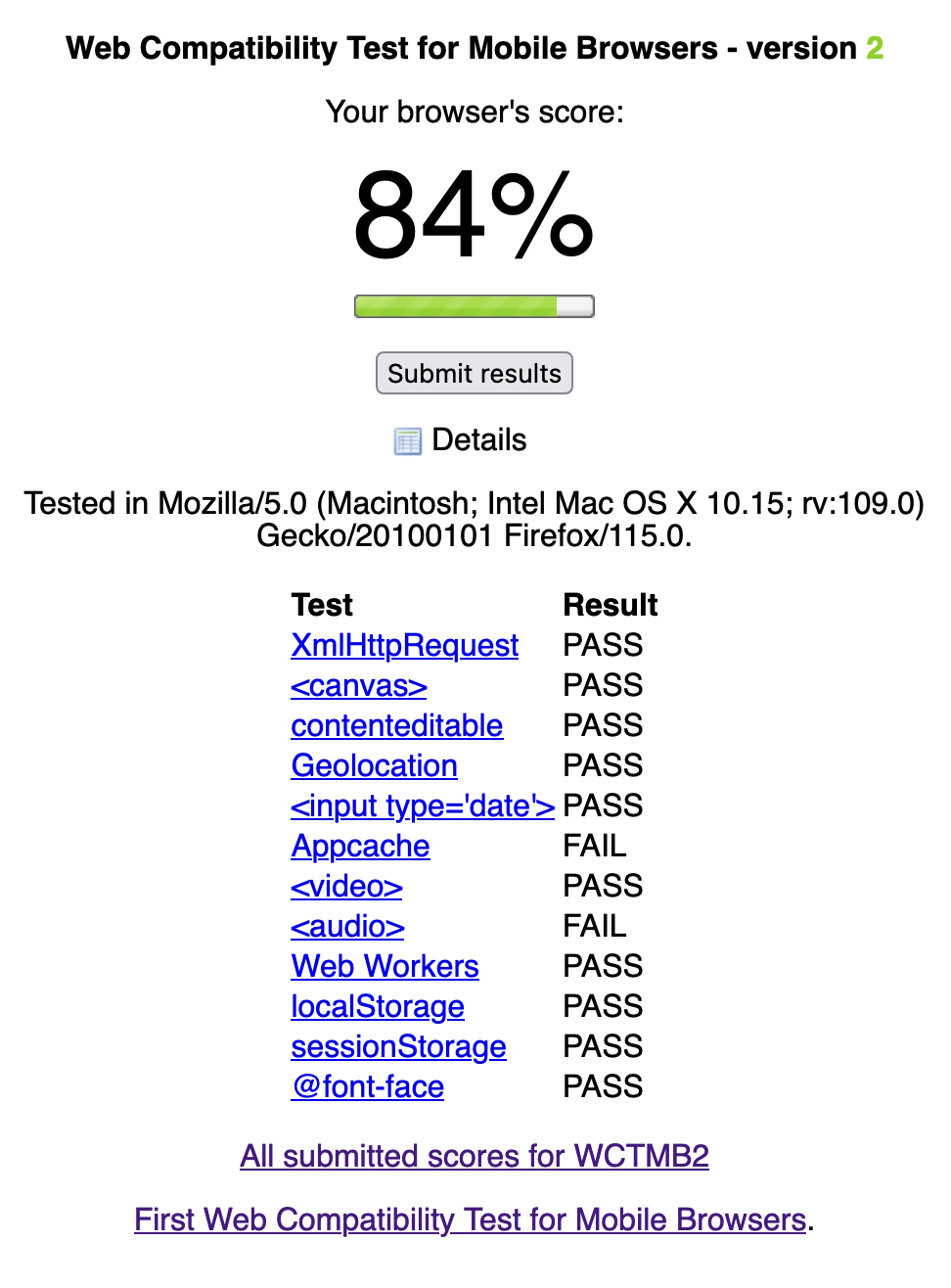
Scores for the second version of the test for Firefox 115

== See also ==
- Comparison of layout engines
- Web Standards Project
