= Designing with Web Standards =

Web development book by Jeffrey Zeldman

- Author: Jeffrey Zeldman
- Language: English
- Genre: Non-fiction
- Publisher: New Riders
- Publication date: 2003
- ISBN: 9780735712010

Designing with Web Standards, first published in 2003 with revised editions in 2007 and 2009, is a web development book by Jeffrey Zeldman. The book's audience is primarily web development professionals who aim to produce design work that complies with web standards. The work is used as a textbook in over 85 colleges.

== Summary ==
Written by Jeffrey Zeldman, a leading proponent of standards-compliant web design, Designing with Web Standards guides the reader on how to better utilize web standards pragmatically to create accessible, user-friendly web sites. Designing with Web Standards reiterates many of the arguments previously advanced by the Web Standards Project to highlight the benefits of standards-compliant web design.

The book first came out in 2003, and appeared in two revised editions, one in 2007, and another, co-authored with Ethan Marcotte, in 2009. Also in 2009, a companion volume appeared from the same publisher under the title Developing with Web Standards, written by John Allsopp.

== Critique ==
The book's third and most recent edition was released on October 25, 2009, by New Riders Press. It has received generally positive feedback, with a four out of five-star rating on Amazon.com from 137 reviewers.

Reviewers have noted that the witty, conversational tone of the book mixed with the in-depth technical analysis is enough “to keep you turning the pages.” Amazon.com book reviewer David Wall notes that the book is “a fantastic education that any design professional will appreciate.” A wall goes on to praise Zeldman's pragmatic approach, as well as the “tightly focused tips” he provides and bolsters with code examples to illustrate his point.

Some critics have said that the book is aimed more at web design novices and mentions a few out-of-date browsers, and is devoid of a lot of detail.

== Impact ==
The first half of Zeldman's Designing With Web Standards in 2003 consolidated the case for web standards in terms of accessibility, search engine optimization, portability of content with an eye toward mobile and other emerging environments, lowered bandwidth and production cost, and other benefits. This section of the book addressed marketers and site owners as well as web developers and designers. The second section of the book was a how-to for designers and developers. How-to books were common in the web industry, although almost none at the time taught web standards. What made the first edition of Designing with Web Standards unique was its focus on making the case for forwarding compatibility, accessibility, and SEO to all who own, manage or use web sites, not just developers.

The book is credited with converting the industry from tag soup and Flash to semantics and accessibility via correct use of HTML, CSS, and JavaScript. Subsequent editions, while continuing to address the state of the Web and the benefits of standards-based design, have also focused on emerging technologies such as HTML5 and CSS3, and on emerging design strategies such as Responsive Web Design (RWD) and "Mobile First."

The book cover famously showed Zeldman with a blue knit hat, which inspired Douglas Vos to invent the Blue Beanie Day, an annual international celebration of web standards which began in 2007.

== Translations ==
Designing with Web Standards has been translated into 15 different languages, including (for the last edition) Italian, Chinese, Hungarian, Polish and Portuguese.
