= Jeffrey Zeldman =

American entrepreneur and web designer

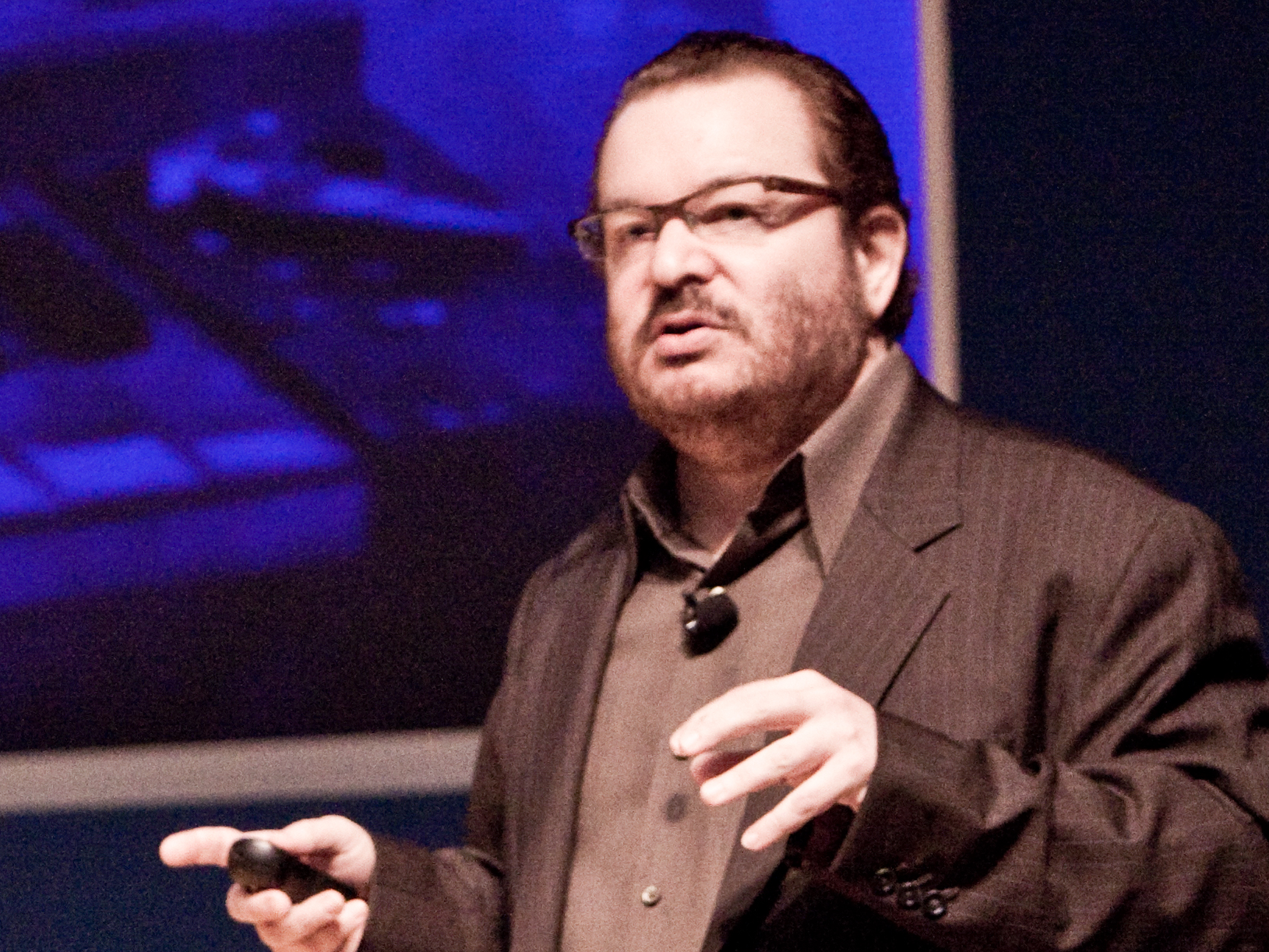
- Zeldman at An Event Apart 2011
- Born: 12 January 1955 (age 71)
- Education: Indiana University Bloomington (BA); University of Virginia (MFA)
- Occupation: Founder/Executive Creative Director/Publisher
- Known for: A List Apart, Designing with Web Standards, Happy Cog, Web Standards Project, An Event Apart, A Book Apart
- Children: Ava Zeldman
- Parent(s): Maurice Zeldman and Phyllis Sylvia Zeldman
- Website: zeldman.com

Jeffrey Zeldman is an American entrepreneur, web designer, author, podcaster and speaker on web design. He is the co-founder of A List Apart Magazine and the Web Standards Project. He also founded the design studios Happy Cog and studio.zeldman, and co-founded the A Book Apart imprint and the design conference An Event Apart.

== Early life ==
Jeffrey Zeldman was born on January 12, 1955, in Queens, New York, to the robotics engineer Maurice Zeldman and his wife Phyllis Sylvia Zeldman. When he was four years of age, his family moved to Long Island. When he was eight, they moved to Connecticut, and at age thirteen, they moved to Pittsburgh. He earned an undergraduate degree from Indiana University Bloomington in 1977, and an Master of Fine Arts in fiction writing from University of Virginia in 1979.

== Career ==
Jeffrey Zeldman briefly worked as a reporter for The Washington Post and ten years as an advertising copywriter before turning to web design in 1995. He rose to prominence as an authority on web design in the second half of the nineties by advocating a middle ground between the aesthetically oriented position of David Siegel and the functionally oriented position of Jakob Nielsen, viewing function and aesthetics as complementary rather than polar opposites. In 1998, he co-founded the Web Standards Project with George Olsen and Glenn Davis, serving as project leader from 1999 to 2002. His persistent activism for the adoption of web standards has since earned him accolades such as "standards champion," "godfather of web standards," and "a foremost advocate for the potential of the web."

== Web publications ==
Zeldman has maintained his personal website, Zeldman.com, since 1995, initially featuring a blend of web design tips, opinion, and entertainment. In the early years, the site included a humorous treatise on Lawrence Welk, free icons and backgrounds for visitors to use, and a web design tutorial titled "Ask Dr. Web". The site's Daily Report subsequently became "a fountain of information regarding standards-compliant design."

In 1998, Zeldman co-launched A List Apart, a web magazine which explores the design, development, and meaning of web content, with a focus on the techniques and benefits of designing with web standards. Among his many contributions to A List Apart, his article "To Hell with Bad Browsers," published in February 2001, has been cited as a turning point in the adoption of Cascading Style Sheets for their intended purpose of articulating layouts.

Zeldman also co-hosts The Big Web Show, a podcast about the web and online publishing.

== Design agency ==
In 1999, Zeldman founded Happy Cog, a web and interaction design studio specializing in user-and content-focused, standards-compliant design. In 2016, Zeldman's business association with Happy Cog ended, and he launched an independent design consultancy called Studio Zeldman.

== Print publications ==
Zeldman has authored two books, Taking your Talent to the Web, which was published in 2001, and Designing with Web Standards, which first came out in 2003, and appeared in two revised editions, one in 2007, and one in 2009. Designing with Web Standards reiterates many of the arguments made by the Web Standards Project to highlight the benefits of standards-compliant web design. Having been translated into thirteen languages, the book brought standards awareness to a new international audience.

In 2010, Zeldman expanded his publishing work beyond web magazines with the creation of the A Book Apart imprint. Its books are designed to be quick reads and treat advanced topics in web design with a strong point of view.

== Web Design Conference ==
In 2005, Zeldman and Eric A. Meyer founded An Event Apart, "the design conference for people who make websites." An Event Apart is an "intensely educational two-day learning session for passionate practitioners of standards-based web design" followed by an optional day-long workshop on such topics as mobile web design, advanced accessible web design, HTML5, and CSS3. The conference currently takes place in seven cities annually. Cities and speakers vary. Speakers, in addition to offering informative content, must have made major contributions to web design or development in order to qualify to speak at the event.

== Innovations ==
Zeldman and Happy Cog were early advocates of standards-based web design and many of their current and former employees have greatly contributed to various initiatives on the web, including:

- The development of "real type on the web" via CSS and services including Typekit.
- Popularizing such ideas as CSS layout, responsive design, and style switching. The last of these was an early 2000 innovation which paved the way for later third-party innovations including CSS Zen Garden and a web site known as Readability.
- The second revised edition of Designing With Web Standards, issued in 2007, which famously showed Zeldman with a blue knit hat on its book cover, inspired Douglas Vos to invent the Blue Beanie Day, an annual international celebration of web standards which began in 2007.

== Personal life ==
Zeldman has been teetotal since 1993.

== Bibliography ==
- Apfelbaum, Sue; Cezzar, Juliette (2014). Designing the Editorial Experience: A Primer for Print, Web, and Mobile. Beverly, MA: Rockport Publishers. ISBN 978-1-59253-895-9.
- Cederholm, Dan (2004). Web standards solutions: the markup and style handbook (1st ed.). Berkeley, Calif.: Apress. ISBN 1590593812.
- Clarke, Andy (2010). Hardboiled web design. Penarth [Wales]: Five Simple Steps. ISBN 978-1907828003.
- Clarke, Andy; Holzschlag, Molly E. (2007). Transcending CSS: the fine art of web design. Berkeley, Calif.: New Riders. ISBN 978-0321410979.
- Engholm, Ida (2002-12-01). "Digital Style History: The Development of Graphic Design on the Internet". Digital Creativity. 13 (4): 193–211. doi:10.1076/digc.13.4.193.8672. ISSN 1462-6268. S2CID 28354691.
- Kennedy, Helen (December 15, 2011). Net Work: Ethics and Values in Web Design. Palgrave Macmillan. ISBN 978-0230231375.
- Keith, Jeremy (2007). Bulletproof Ajax ([Online Ed.]. ed.). Berkeley, Calif.: New Riders. ISBN 978-0321472663.
- Shea, Dave; Holzschlag, Molly E. (2005). The Zen of CSS design: visual enlightenment for the web. Berkeley, CA: New Riders/Peachpit Press. ISBN 9780321303479.
- Stocks, Elliot Jay; Whitaker, Keir (2012). Insites: the book. Viewport Industries. ISBN 978-0957390508.
