= CSS Zen Garden =

World Wide Web development resource

- Website: www.csszengarden.com
- Launched: May 2003

The CSS Zen Garden is a World Wide Web development resource "built to demonstrate what can be accomplished visually through CSS-based design." It launched in May 2003.

Style sheets contributed by graphic designers from around the world are used to change the visual presentation of a single HTML file, producing hundreds of different designs. Aside from reference to an external CSS file, the HTML markup itself never changes. All visual differences are the result of the CSS (and supporting imagery).

== History ==
CSS Zen Garden brought five designs at launch.

The website was inspired by a CSS-related contest from HotBot, by web developer Chris Casciano's experiment called "Daily CSS Fun", as well as the Web Standards Project's efforts to get CSS adopted more widely by designers. Considered "one of the best-known and most inspirational projects to come out of to the web standards movement," the site has succeeded at "raising aesthetic standards on the web and enriching web design." The noted web standards advocate Jeffrey Zeldman observes: "Hundreds of designers have made their mark -- and sometimes their reputations -- by creating Zen Garden layouts, and tens of thousands all over the world have learned to love CSS because of it."

CSS Zen Garden has been translated into several languages and inspired similar sites in other languages.

In February 2005, The Zen of CSS Design (Peachpit Press) was published by CSS Zen Garden creator Dave Shea and web designer Molly Holzschlag. The book is based on 36 designs featured at the Zen Garden site.

Active development of the site stopped in April 2008. However, on May 7, 2013, for the site's tenth anniversary, Shea opened up submissions again, focusing on HTML5, CSS3 and current design principles. There are currently 218 listed designs for the Zen Garden.

== See also ==
- Web standards
- A List Apart

== Bibliography ==
- Kennedy, Helen (2012). Net Work: Ethics and Values in Web Design. New York: Palgrave Macmillan. ISBN 978-0-230-23140-5.
- Shea, Dave; Holzschlag, Molly E. (2005). The Zen of CSS Design: Visual Enlightenment for the Web. San Francisco: Peachpit Press. ISBN 978-0-321-30347-9.
- Zeldman, Jeffrey (2007). Designing with Web Standards (2nd ed.). Berkeley: New Riders. ISBN 978-0-321-38555-0.
