= Nick Finck =

American design professional

- Born: 14 March 1975 (age 50)
- Citizenship: United States
- Occupation: Design professional
- Employer: Craft & Rigor
- Known for: Progressive enhancement
- Spouse: Megan Gill
- Children: Luka & Sofia
- Parent: William And Marilyn Finck

Nick Finck is a UX & design professional, advisor, mentor, coach, speaker and is the founder of Craft & Rigor, a design operations consultancy, in Seattle, Washington. He is known as the co-creator of progressive enhancement. Nick was a co-creator if the Web Standards Project (WaSP) Education Task Force curriculum (Interact/WaSP) which was later merged into the W3C's learning material.

He was the founder and publisher of Digital Web Magazine, a publication for web professionals, in 1996 until it ceased publication in 2009.

Nick was a founding member of the Web Standards Project (WaSP), and a founding member of the Information Architecture Institute (IAI). He was also the Pacific Northwest Ambassador for UXnet prior to it being disbanded in 2010.

== Professional background ==
In 1994 Nick established his first web consultancy, Designs by Nick Finck, based out of Portland, Oregon. Since then he has headed up design a research at many agencies and tech product & service companies.

Nick was the head of design & research at AWS (2013-2015), product design manager for Platform at Facebook (2015-2017), he was the head of design & research at Ubermind (2011-2013) which was acquired by Deloitte in 2012, the head of design & research and founder of the Seattle office of projekt202 (2013), and co-founder of Blue Flavor (2005-2011) that was acquired by Blink in 2010.

== See also ==
- NickFinck.com (personal website)
- Progressive enhancement (co-creator)
- Information architecture
- liquid web design

== Interviews ==
- Aurelius Podcast - Episode 46 – Leadership, career progression, hiring & job hunting in UX with Nick Finck
- Making UX Work with Joe Natoli - Episode 17, Nick Finck - removing fear, reaching out and remaining hungry
- User Defenders podcast - Episode 036 - No Designer Left Behind with Nick Finck
- iStockPhoto
- South by Southwest Tech Report
