= Sunspider =

Sunspider may refer to:

- SunSpider JavaScript Benchmark, a system to benchmark the speed of JavaScript engines
- Sun spider, a common name for Solifugae, an order of Arachnid (spider-like animals)
- Sun-Spider, an alternative version of the comic book superhero Spider-Man
