= Touchstone (metaphor) =

Measure to test a metaphorical concept

As a metaphor, a touchstone is any physical or intellectual measure by which the validity or merit of a concept can be tested. It is similar in use to an acid test, or a litmus test in politics.

The word was introduced into literary criticism by Matthew Arnold in "Preface to the volume of 1853 poems" (1853) to denote short but distinctive passages, selected from the writings of the greatest poets, which he used to determine the relative value of passages or poems which are compared to them. Arnold proposed this method of evaluation as a corrective for what he called the "fallacious" estimates of poems according to their "historic" importance in the development of literature, or else according to their "personal" appeal to an individual critic.

== Origin of the term ==
A touchstone is a small tablet of dark stone such as fieldstone, slate, or lydite, used for assaying precious metal alloys. It has a finely grained surface on which soft metals leave a visible trace.

== In literature ==
An example in literature is the character of Touchstone in Shakespeare's As You Like It, described as "a wise fool who acts as a kind of guide or point of reference throughout the play, putting everyone, including himself, to the comic test".

Dante's "In la sua volontade è nostra pace" ("In his will is our peace"; Paradiso, III.85)

A touchstone can be a short passage from recognized masters' works used in assessing the relative merit of poetry and literature. This sense of the term was coined by Matthew Arnold in his essay "The Study of Poetry", where he gives Hamlet's dying words to Horatio as an example of a touchstone.

== In German politics ==
In Germany, various interest groups sometimes send questionnaires to the campaigning political parties before federal parliament elections. These questionnaires, consisting of political survey questions the interest groups are interested in, are often called "electoral touchstones" (German: Wahlprüfsteine). Those answers of a political party which might support or threaten the political goals of an interest group are finally published by the group in order to influence the voting behavior of potential voters being in favor of the political views of the interest group.
