= The Zen of CSS Design =

Book by Dave Shea

- Author: Dave Shea and Molly E. Holzschlag
- Subject: CSS, Web design
- Genre: Non-fiction
- Publisher: Peachpit Press
- Publication date: February 27, 2005
- Pages: 304
- ISBN: 978-0-321-30347-9
- OCLC: 58393096

The Zen of CSS Design: Visual Enlightenment for the Web is a book by web designers Dave Shea and Molly E. Holzschlag, published in 2005.

== Content ==
The book is based on 36 designs featured at the CSS Zen Garden resource, an online showcase of CSS-based design. The process that each designer took in coming up with the final design is examined in each case study.

== Reception ==
It was reviewed favorably by freelance Web designer Karen Morrill-McClure of Digital Web Magazine:

The perfect coffee table book for a Web designer—lots of pictures of Web pages and loads of good information.

== See also ==
- CSS
- Zen
- CSS Zen Garden
- Web design
