= Cool Site of the Day =

Early website created in August 1994

- Available in: English
- Owner: Unknown
- Founder: Glenn Davis
- Website: www.coolsiteoftheday.com
- Launched: August 10, 1994; 32 years ago
- Current status: Inactive

Cool Site of the Day was an early website created in August 1994 and originally maintained by Glenn Davis. Linking to one single recommended site off its homepage each day, it soon became an arbiter of taste on the Internet.

Within a few months of its launch, Cool Site of the Day attracted "around 10,000 visitors" each day; within a year of its launch, more than 20,000 people were visiting each day, and the award became a coveted prize among Silicon Alley start-ups. Cool Site of the Day also sparked a great number of similar coolness awards.

The site's founder, Glenn Davis, became a celebrity, giving interviews to magazines and radio networks such as NPR while fending off gifts from site maintainers who sought his recommendation of their sites. Newsweek celebrated Davis as one of the fifty most influential people on the Internet, dubbing him the "King of Cool."

In time for the first anniversary of Cool Site of the Day Davis inaugurated the Cool Site Of The Year award, also known as the Webby, which was first produced by Kay Dangaard and presented by John Brancato and Michael Ferris at the Hollywood Roosevelt Hotel as a nod to the first site of the Academy of Motion Picture Arts and Sciences (Oscars) Hollywood, California, in August 1995. As part of the proceedings, Davis held an email poll on a shortlist of five websites that had previously been distinguished as a cool site. The award was won by the pioneer webisodic serial The Spot. On October 3, 1996, the second Cool Site of the Year awards ceremony was held at Webster Hall, a nightclub in the East Village, Manhattan.

Davis left the site in November 1995, but it continued to thrive. By the end of 1997, Cool Site of the Day had spawned thousands of imitators, grown into an "eight-person mini-e-publishing empire," and attracted millions of page-views a month. Davis' former employer decided to sell the site at this point.

By the 2010s, Cool Site of the Day had moved away from its original purpose in general content curation and instead became a blog specializing in search engine optimization, although the site continued to carry its past archives. During the first week of February 2020, the website as it had progressed to that point was removed without notice. Within a week, it had returned stripped bare of all previous content, including any trace of the Cool Site of the Day archives. Since this time, the website's sole visible content has consisted of a (now-broken) email form widget offering a "free visibility report" to visitors.
