= Blue Beanie Day =

Holiday created in 2007 to promote web standards

- Observed by: Standardistas
- Liturgical color: Blue
- Date: November 30
- Next time: November 30, 2025
- Frequency: Annual
- First time: November 30, 2007

Blue Beanie Day is an annual international celebration of web standards which began in 2007. It was originated by Douglas Vos and popularized by Jeffrey Zeldman, the author of Designing with Web Standards. The commemoration, which is accompanied by web developers sharing photographs of themselves in blue beanies, seeks to raise awareness of web design features such as progressive enhancement and accessible, semantic markup and "fight Web Standards Apathy". Users use the hashtag #BlueBeanieDay, change their social media avatars to show themselves in blue headgear, and share information and links to content promoting the open web and online accessibility. The origin of the name of the holiday is the image of Jeffrey Zeldman on the cover of his book wearing a blue knit cap. Over the years, the Blue Beanie Day also became an action day for web accessibility, for which the correct use of web standards is a basic requirement.
