= Christopher Schmitt =

American web designer (1975–2020)

- Born: February 24, 1975; Tallahassee, Florida
- Died: April 9, 2020 (aged 45); Austin, Texas
- Occupation: Web designer
- Years active: 1993–2020

Christopher Richard Schmitt was a web designer, author, trainer, and speaker who lived in Austin, TX.

== Early life and education ==
Christopher Schmitt was born February 24, 1975, in Tallahassee, Florida. He interned for both David Siegel and Lynda Weinman in the mid-90s while he was an undergraduate at Florida State University (FSU) working on a fine arts degree.

Afterward, he earned a master's in communication for Interactive and New Communication Technologies while obtaining a graduate certificate in project management from FSU's College of Communication.

== Career ==
As a member of the Web Standards Project, Schmitt co-led the Adobe Task Force and was a member of the Educational Task Force. He was the founder of Heat Vision, a web design and new media publishing studio.

He was the author of CSS Cookbook, which was named Best Web Design Book of 2006, and one of the first books that looked at CSS-enabled designs, Designing CSS Web Pages (New Riders). He was also the co-author of Adapting to Web Standards (New Riders), Professional CSS (Wrox), Photoshop in 10 Steps or Less (Wiley) and Dreamweaver Design Projects (glasshaus) and contributed four chapters to XML, HTML, and XHTML Magic (New Riders). Schmitt also wrote for New Architect Magazine, A List Apart, Digital Web and Web Reference.

In 2009 he co-founded Environments for Humans, through which he chairs both physical (AIGA In Control Web Design Workshop Conference) and online conferences (CSS Summit, jQuery Summit, etc.) geared to Web design professionals.

Schmitt died on April 9, 2020, at his home in Austin, Texas.

== Publications ==
- Co-author, Designing CSS Web Pages, New Riders (2002) ISBN 0-7357-1263-8
- Co-author, Dreamweaver MX Design Projects, Friends of ED (2003) 1-590-59153-4
- Co-author, Dreamweaver MX 2004 Design Projects, Friends of ED (2004) 1-590-59409-6
- Co-author, Adobe Photoshop CS in 10 Simple Steps or Less, Wiley (2004) ISBN 0-7645-4237-0
- Author, CSS Cookbook, O'Reilly (2004) ISBN 0-596-00576-8
- Co-author, Professional CSS: Cascading Style Sheets for Web Design, Wrox (2005) ISBN 0-7645-8833-8
- Author, CSS Cookbook, 2nd Edition, O'Reilly (2006) ISBN 0-596-52741-1
- Co-author, Adapting to Web Standards: CSS and Ajax for Big Sites, New Riders (2007) ISBN 0-321-50182-9
- Co-author, Professional CSS: Cascading Style Sheets for Web Design, 2nd Edition, Wrox (2008) ISBN 0-470-17708-X
- Author, CSS Cookbook, 3rd Edition, O'Reilly (2009) ISBN 0-596-15593-X
- Co-author, Web Design with Web Standards: InterAct Classroom Project, New Riders (2010) ISBN 0-321-70352-9
