= HTML5 Boilerplate =

- Developers: Paul Irish, Divya Manian, Mathias Bynens, Nicolas Gallagher
- Release: March 21, 2011; 15 years ago
- Stable release: 9.0.1 / April 16, 2024; 2 years ago
- Written in: HTML, CSS, JavaScript
- License: MIT
- Website: html5boilerplate.com

HTML5 Boilerplate is an HTML, CSS and JavaScript template (or boilerplate) for creating HTML5 websites with cross-browser compatibility.

== See also ==
- Browse Happy
