= Sara Wachter-Boettcher =

Sara Wachter-Boettcher is an author, consultant and speaker. She is the author of Technically Wrong and Content Everywhere and the co-author, with Eric Meyer, of Design for Real Life. Her book Technically Wrong: Sexist Apps, Biased Algorithms, and Other Threats of Toxic Tech was recommended by Wired magazine as one of the best tech books in 2017 and by Fast Company as one of the best business and leadership books in 2017.

She has written for various newspapers and magazines, including Slate and The Guardian.

Wachter-Boettcher is considered an expert on FemTech and the lack of diversity in technology in general. Her works have also received attention in academic literature on technology and algorithms.
