= Dave Shea (web designer) =

Canadian web designer

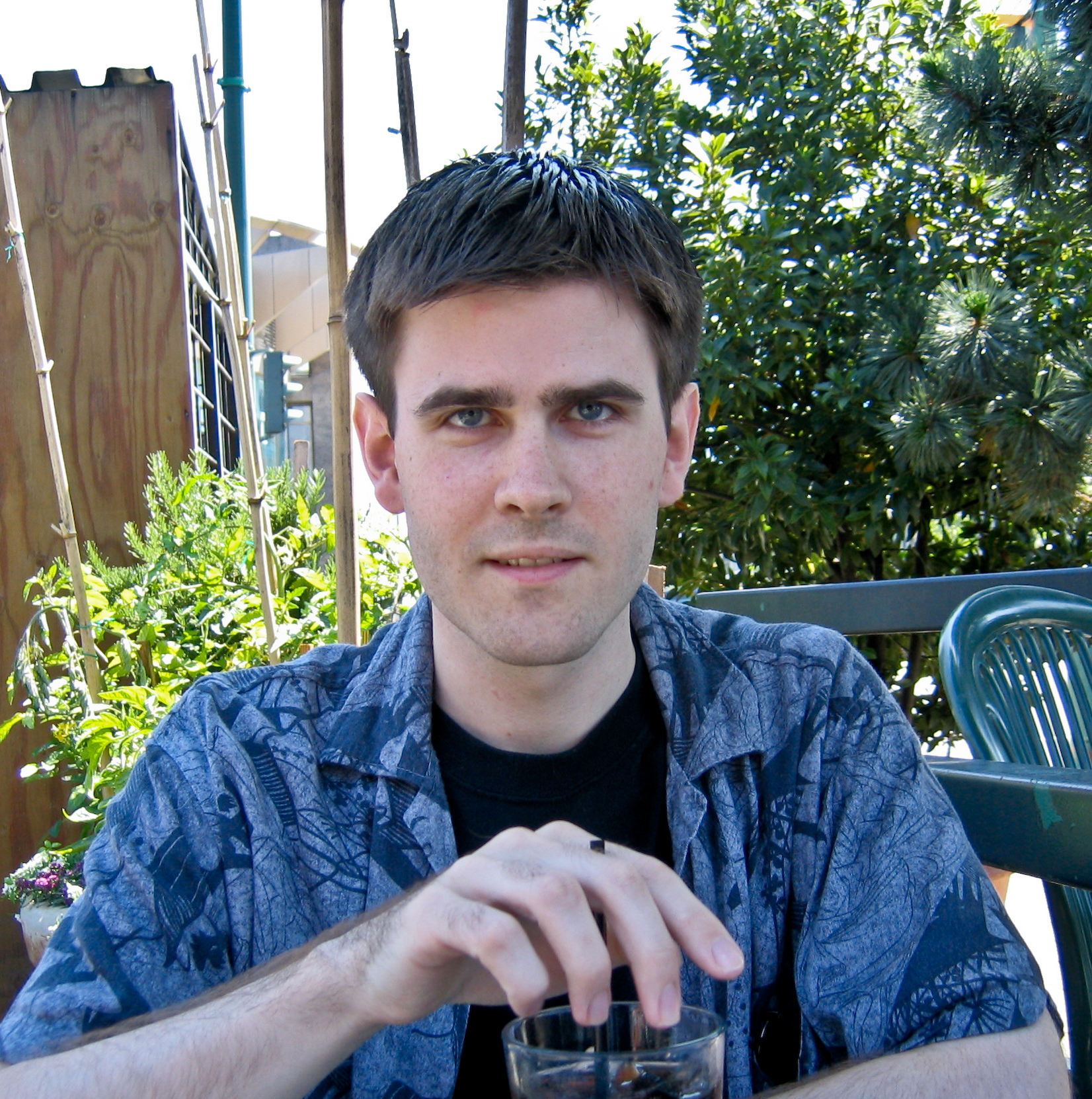
- Dave Shea in June 2003
- Born: Canada
- Occupation: web designer
- Website: daveshea.com

Dave Shea is a Canadian web designer and co-author of The Zen of CSS Design: Visual Enlightenment for the Web.

He is known for his work in web-standard development—from his design community project CSS Zen Garden to his active contributions at the Web Standards Project (WaSP). Shea is also a writer “for a large global audience of web designers and developers on his popular blog, Mezzoblue” Dave Shea - WaSP Member, emphasis on original. The Web Standard Project and is the founder and creative director of Bright Creative in Vancouver, BC.

== Publications ==
Along with co-authoring his own book with Molly Holzschlag, Shea has contributed to online magazines Digital Web Magazine and A List Apart. His web work has been featured in publications such as Page Magazine, Stylesheet Stylebook, Linux Format Magazine, PIXELmag, and DMXZone.

== Award(s) ==
- Shea was awarded Best of Show 2004 at the South by Southwest Interactive conference in Austin, TX.

== See also ==
- CSS Zen Garden
- Cascading Style Sheets
