= Ian Hickson =

British-American software engineer

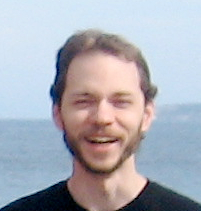
- Born: Geneva, Switzerland
- Citizenship: American
- Education: (BSc) University of Bath
- Organization(s): Netscape, Opera, Google
- Known for: HTML5, CSS 2.1, Flutter (software)

Ian "Hixie" Hickson is a British-American software engineer, author and maintainer of the Acid2 and Acid3 tests, the WHATWG HTML 5 specification, and the Pingback specification, and the early working draft of Web Applications 1.0. He is known as a proponent of Web standards, and has played a crucial role in the development of specifications such as CSS. Hickson was a co-editor of the CSS 2.1 specification.

Hickson was born in Geneva, Switzerland, and lived there for ten years. He studied physics at the University of Bath in England. Later he was employed at Netscape and Opera Software; he worked for Google in the San Francisco Bay Area, and was the founding specification editor of the Web Hypertext Application Technology Working Group (WHATWG). Hickson resigned from Google in late 2023.
