= Acid test =

Process of distinguishing gold from base metals, with a figurative meaning

An acid test is a qualitative chemical or metallurgical assay using acid. Historically, it often involved the use of a robust acid to distinguish gold from base metals. Figuratively, the term represents any definitive test for attributes, such as gauging a person's character or evaluating a product's performance.

== Chemistry ==
A visualization of the aqua fortis (nitric acid) and aqua regia acid tests on zinc, copper, silver, and gold.

Testing for gold with acid capitalizes on gold's status as a noble metal, resistant to corrosion, oxidation, or acid. The procedure includes rubbing the gold-colored item on black stone, leaving a visible mark. The mark undergoes scrutiny by applying nitric acid, which dissolves the mark of any item not gold, stainless steel, zinc, tungsten, aluminum, platinum, or palladium. If the mark persists, further testing involves aqua regia (nitric acid and hydrochloric acid). If the mark dissolves, the item proves to be genuine gold. More precise assessment of fineness or purity is achieved using varying strengths of aqua regia and comparative testing against known fineness.

== Geology ==
In geological applications, detecting the presence of calcite or other forms of calcium carbonate in alkaline soils or during lithological analysis involves using dilute hydrochloric acid and observing effervescence.

== Figurative meanings ==
The figurative usage of the expression gained popularity during and after the California Gold Rush, but had currency even before then. An example from the Wisconsin newspaper The Columbia Reporter, November 1845, illustrates this: "Twenty-four years of service demonstrates his ability to stand the acid test, as Gibson’s Soap Polish has done for over thirty years."

Other instances of the figurative use of the phrase include websites like Acid1, Acid2, and Acid3, designed to test web browsers for compliance with current web standards. Financial analysts also employ the "acid test" nickname for the quick ratio method, which assesses the liquidity of a business.

The term "acid test" took on a different meaning in the realm of experiences with the psychedelic drug lysergic acid diethylamide (LSD), colloquially called "acid", popularized by the Merry Pranksters.
