= Glenn Davis (web design) =

American web designer

- Born: June 21, 1961 (age 65); United States
- Occupation: Web designer
- Known for: Cool Site of the Day

Glenn Davis (born June 21, 1961) was one of the first web designers. He is best known for his websites Cool Site of the Day and Project Cool and for being a founding member of the Web Standards Project.

Davis created Cool Site of the Day in August 1994. Linking to one single recommended site off its homepage each day, the site soon became an arbiter of taste on the Internet, and its award was a coveted prize among Silicon Alley start-ups. Cool Site of the Day also sparked a large number of similar coolness awards.

== Achievements ==
Davis became a celebrity through Cool Site of the Day, giving interviews to magazines and radio networks such as NPR while fending off gifts from site maintainers who sought his recommendation of their sites. Newsweek celebrated Davis as one of the 50 most important people on the Internet in 1995, dubbing him the "King of Cool."

In time for the first anniversary of Cool Site of the Day, Davis inaugurated the Cool Site Of The Year award, also known as the Webby, which was first presented in Hollywood, California, in August 1995, and was given to The Spot.

Davis left Cool Site of the Day in November 1995. In January 1996 he founded Project Cool with Teresa Martin, a new media specialist at Knight Ridder. This new venture was conceived as an educational resource center teaching web development. Project Cool continued the daily award concept under the name "Project Cool Sighting." The site became a respected and widely used resource on web development techniques, and its founders co-authored two books to complement it. Davis co-founded the Web Standards Project with Tim Bray, Jeffrey Zeldman and George Olsen, among others. In 2000, he founded Astounding Websites, an online forum created to review and discuss the best writing, design, and programming on the web. Davis gave up on the web as a medium in 2002, dismissing it as "old hat" because he believed there was little room for significant further breakthroughs.

Davis has been recognized for defining the technique of "liquid" web design.

Davis came back to the web in April 2022 launching his new website Verevolf, where he publishes web history stories.
