= Molly Holzschlag =

American computer scientist (1963–2023)

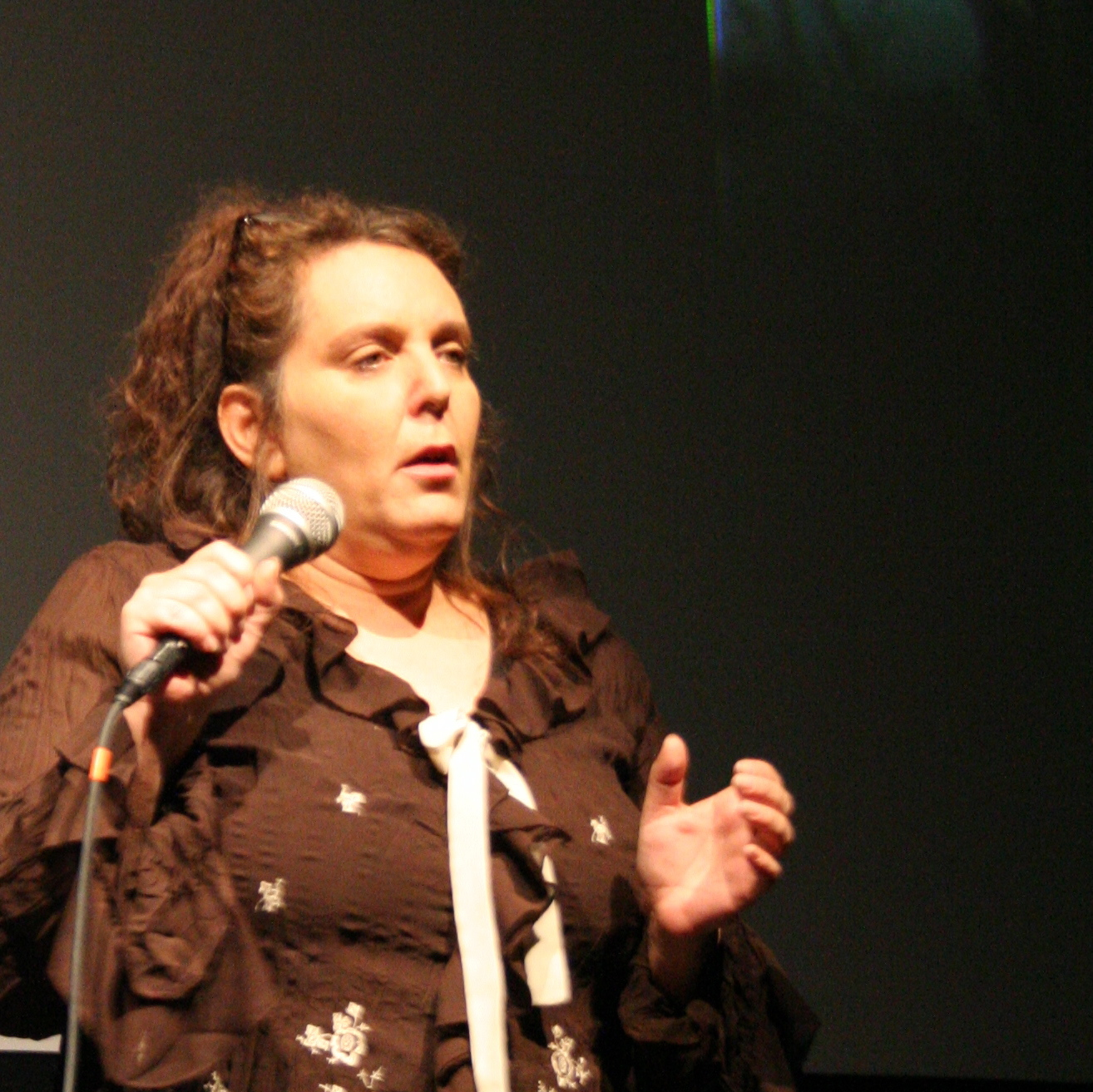
- Holzschlag in 2009
- Born: January 25, 1963; Brooklyn, New York City, U.S.
- Died: September 5, 2023 (aged 60); Tucson, Arizona, U.S.
- Occupations: Web developer; educator; author; accessibility advocate; computational linguist
- Notable work: Wrote or co-authored 35 books on web design and open standards, including The Zen of CSS Design
- Spouse: Raymond Poore
- Awards: 2016, O'Reilly Web Platform Award; 2015, Net Award for Outstanding contribution; 1998, named one of the Webgrrls San Francisco chapter's Top 25 Women on the Web

Molly Miriam Esther Holzschlag (January 25, 1963 – September 5, 2023) was an American author, lecturer and advocate of the Open Web. She wrote or co-authored 35 books on web design and open standards, including The Zen of CSS Design: Visual Enlightenment for the Web (co-authored with Dave Shea). She was nicknamed the "Fairy Godmother of the Web".

== Campaigning for web standards ==
Holzschlag conceived and led the first five years of Open Web Camp, a free event in Silicon Valley from 2009 to 2013. Her work focused on Open Web technologies, web design, and accessibility. She was the 2004–2006 group lead for the Web Standards Project (WaSP), a coalition that campaigned browser makers such as Microsoft, Opera, and Netscape to support modern web standards. Her obituary in the Tucson Sentinel reported that "more than once, she challenged Bill Gates face-to-face to fix problems with Internet Explorer".

She participated as a World Wide Web Consortium (W3C) invited expert on the CSS Working Group, chaired the CSS Accessibility Community Group, and was an invited expert on the HTML and GEO working groups.

== Teaching work ==
In 2011, Holzschlag worked for Knowbility, teaching classes on Open Web technologies such as HTML5 and ARIA, with a strong emphasis on using inclusive design to overcome accessibility barriers. She also taught webmaster courses for the University of Arizona, University of Georgia, University of Phoenix, New School University, and Pima Community College.

== Writing ==
Holzschlag wrote or co-authored 35 books on web design and open standards, including The Zen of CSS Design: Visual Enlightenment for the Web (co-authored with Dave Shea). She also reported on music for the Tucson Weekly in the 1990s.

== Personal life ==
Holzschlag was born on January 25, 1963, in Brooklyn. She was diagnosed with aplastic anemia in 2014. She had spoken about the problems with health care funding and raised over $70,000 through GoFundMe in 2013 to fund her chemotherapy. Holzschlag was found dead at home in Tucson, Arizona, on September 5, 2023, at age 60.

== Notable awards ==
- 2016, O'Reilly Web Platform Award
- 2015, Net Award for Outstanding contribution
- 1998, named one of the Webgrrls San Francisco chapter's Top 25 Women on the Web

== Bibliography ==
- Holzschlag, Molly (April 22, 2005). Spring into HTML and CSS. Addison-Wesley. ISBN 9780321604712.
- Holzschlag, Molly; Shea, David (February 27, 2005). The Zen of CSS Design: Visual Enlightenment for the Web. New Riders. ISBN 0321303474.
- Holzschlag, Molly E. (July 9, 2004). 250 HTML and Web Design Secrets. Wiley. ISBN 0764568450.
- Holzschlag, Molly; Glendinning, Porter (May 28, 2004). Sams Teach Yourself Movable Type in 24 Hours. ISBN 067232590X.
- Holzschlag, Molly (April 28, 2004). Design Your Own E-Shop: Creating & Promoting Successful Small Business Sites (Dyo). Bloomsbury Academic. ISBN 2884790217.
- Holzschlag, Molly E. (April 2003). Color for Websites: Digital Media Design (Graphic Design). ISBN 2880467411.
- Holzschlag, Molly E. (March 11, 2003). Cascading Style Sheets: The Designer's Edge. Wiley. ISBN 0782141846.
- Holzschlag, Molly E.; Kettell, Jennifer Ackerman (December 31, 2002). Special Edition Using Macromedia Dreamweaver MX. ISBN 0789727072.
- Holzschlag, Molly (October 28, 2002). Design Your Own Home Page. Bloomsbury Academic. ISBN 2884790136.
- Holzschlag, Molly E. (September 16, 2002). Integrated Web Design: Building the New Breed of Designer & Developer. New Riders. ISBN 0735712336.
- Holzschlag, Molly E. (May 23, 2002). Sams Teach Yourself Adobe LiveMotion 2 in 24 Hours. Sams. ISBN 0672323125.
- Holzschlag, Molly E. (May 14, 2002). Special Edition Using HTML and XHTML. Que. ISBN 0789727315.
- Holzschlag, Molly; Jason, Pellerin (December 20, 2001). Perl Web Site Workshop. Sams. ISBN 0672322757.
- Holzschlag, Molly E. (September 2001). XML, HTML, XHTML Magic. New Riders. ISBN 0735711399.
- Weverka, Peter; Holzschlag, Molly (August 21, 2001). Mastering Frontpage 2002 Premium Edition. Wiley. ISBN 0782140033.
- Holzschlag, Molly E. (December 13, 2000). Special Edition Using XHTML. Que. ISBN 0789724316.
- Holzschlag, Molly E. (January 15, 2000). Sams Teach Yourself Adobe(R) LiveMotion(R) in 24 Hours. ISBN 0672319160.
- Holzschlag, Molly E. (December 22, 1999). Special Edition Using HTML 4 (6th ed.). ISBN 0789722674.
- Holzschlag, Molly; Romaniello, Stephen (November 1999). Mastering Adobe GoLive 4. Sybex. ISBN 0782126049.
- Holzschlag, Molly E. (October 18, 1999). Short Order HTML 4. Hayden Books. ISBN 0789720493.
- Holzschlag, Molly; Tauber, Daniel A. (June 1999). Mastering Microsoft FrontPage 2000 Premium Edition. Wiley. ISBN 0782124569.
- Schmeiser, Lisa; Holzschlag, Molly (December 1998). The Complete Website Kit: Turn Your Website into a Dynamic, Long-Lasting, and Effective Tool. John Wiley & Sons, Incorporated. ISBN 0782124283.
- Holzschlag, Molly E. (1998). Web by Design: The Complete Guide. Sybex. ISBN 0782122019.
- Holzschlag, Molly E.; Lemay, Laura (June 1997). Laura Lemay's Web Workshop: Designing With Stylesheets, Tables, and Frames. Sams.net. ISBN 1575212498.
- Holzschlag, Molly E.; Lemay, Laura (February 1997). Laura Lemay's Guide to Sizzling Web Site Design. Sams.net. ISBN 1575212218.
- Holzschlag, Molly E. (August 1996). Professional Web Design: Theory and Technique on the Cutting Edge. Prima Pub. ISBN 0761507590.
