= Acid1 =

Online HTML rendering test

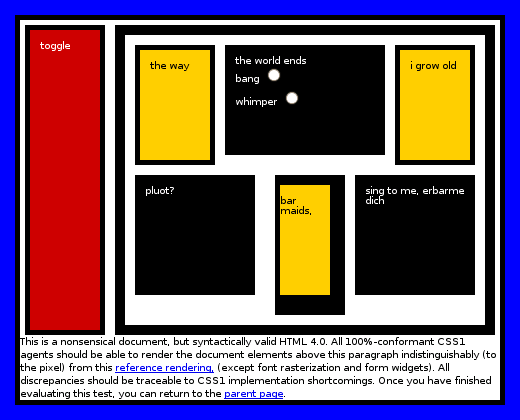
- The "reference rendering" for Acid1
- Website type: Web standards test
- Available in: English language
- Owner: The World Wide Web Consortium
- Creator: Todd Fahrner
- Website: acid1.acidtests.org
- Commercial: No
- Registration: No
- Launched: January 26, 1999
- Current status: Online

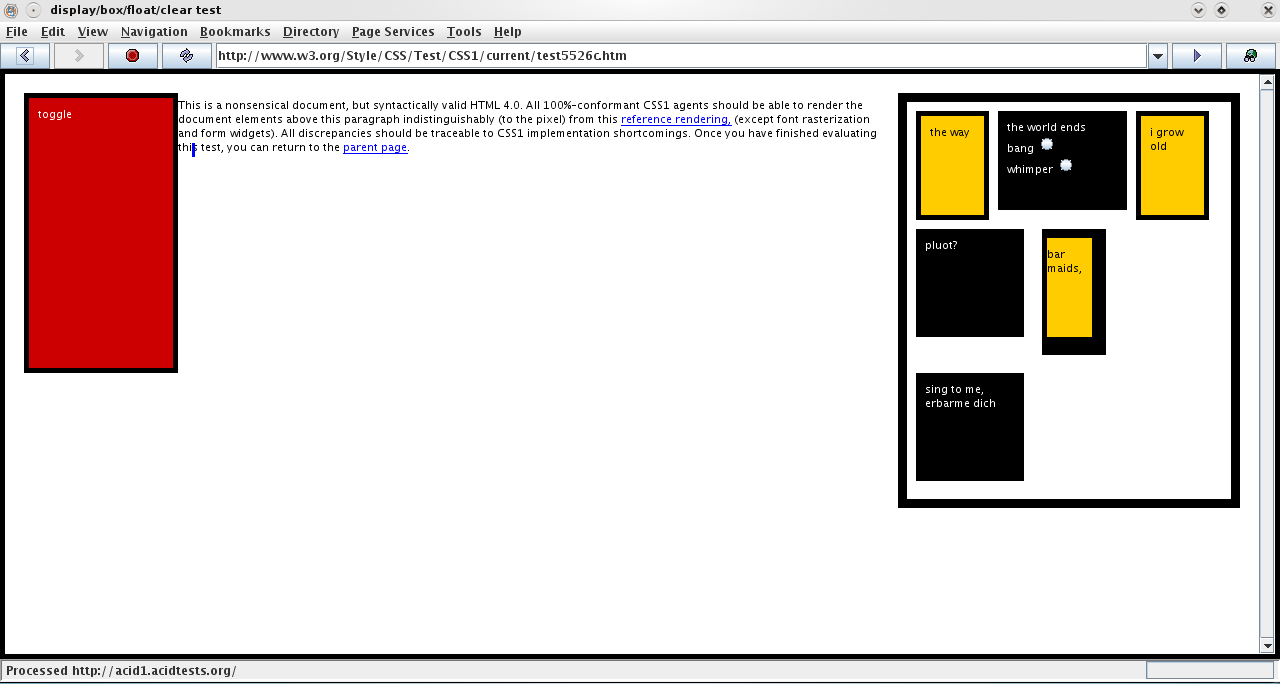
Example of a failed Acid1 test

Easter egg in Internet Explorer 5 for Mac

Acid1, originally called the Box Acid Test, is a test page for web browsers. It was developed in October 1998 and was important in establishing baseline interoperability between early web browsers, especially for the Cascading Style Sheets 1.0 specification. As with acid tests for gold which produce a quick and obvious assessment of the quality of a piece of metal, the web acid tests were designed to produce a clear indication of a browser's compliance to web standards.

== History ==
Acid1 tests many features on one page against a reference image. Acid1 was developed by Todd Fahrner, who was frustrated with the lack of stringent tests to improve browser interoperability. After looking at tests developed by Braden McDaniel that used reference renderings to clarify the intended result, Fahrner developed a comprehensive test that resulted in a quirky-looking graphic. In 1999, the test was incorporated into the CSS1 test suite. The text used in Acid1 is an allusion to T. S. Eliot's poem The Hollow Men. Acid1 is included as an offline Easter egg in Internet Explorer 5 for Mac OS, accessible by typing 'about:tasman', with the text replaced by the names of the developers.

By early 2008, all major browsers passed the Acid1 test.

Acid1 has served as inspiration for Acid2 and Acid3.

== See also ==
- Comparison of browser engines
