= Eric A. Meyer =

Web design consultant and author

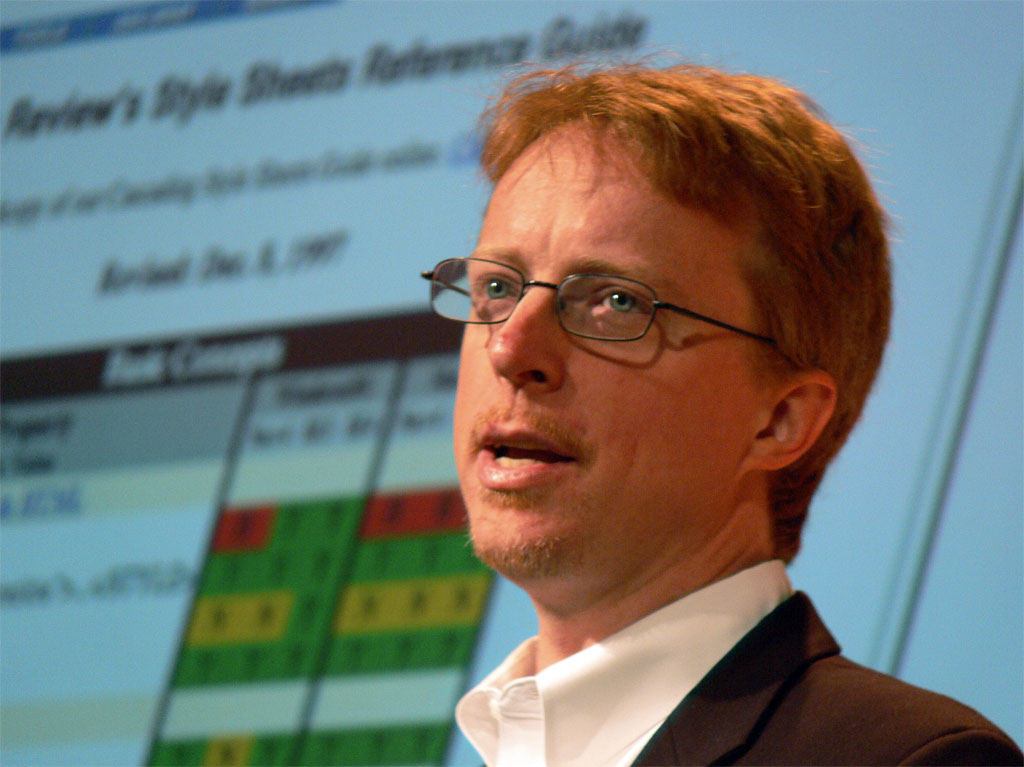
- Eric Meyer at @Media2006 conference
- Education: Case Western Reserve University (BA)
- Occupations: Web design consultant; Author
- Spouse: Kathryn Meyer
- Children: 3
- Website: meyerweb.com/eric/

Eric A. Meyer is an American web design consultant and author. He is best known for his advocacy work on behalf of web standards, most notably CSS (Cascading Style Sheets), a technique for managing how HTML (Hypertext Markup Language) is displayed. Meyer has written a number of books and articles on CSS and given many presentations promoting its use.

== Career ==
From 1992 to 2000, Meyer was employed as a hypermedia systems manager at CWRU. In 1998, he developed the landmark CSS1 test suite with the help of other volunteers, allowing CSS implementors to test their software and address its rendering issues. Meyer joined the Web Standards Project in the same year and became a co-founder of its CSS Samurai, formally known as the CSS Action Committee, an advocacy group which worked with browser vendors to improve CSS support in their products.

A columnist since 1997, a book author and frequent conference speaker on CSS since 2000, Meyer has attained celebrity status in the field of web design.

In 2001, he joined Netscape as an Internet applications manager and remained with the company until 2003.

Meyer is currently a consultant for Complex Spiral Consulting as well as a founding member of the Global Multimedia Protocols Group.

Meyer is also the creator of the S5 format (Simple Standards-Based Slide Show System), an XHTML-based file format for defining slideshows. On July 28, 2005, version 1.1. of S5 was placed in the Public Domain.

In 2008, Meyer supported a Microsoft proposal for Internet Explorer 8 related to backwards compatibility modes for rendering invalid HTML and other markup.

Eric currently works for Igalia.

== Personal life ==
Meyer graduated from Case Western Reserve University (CWRU) in 1992 with a BA in history, and minors in artificial intelligence, astronomy, and English.

He is married to Kathryn Meyer (born Kathryn Fradkin) and has three adopted children. In 2014, his second daughter Rebecca Alison Meyer died of a brain tumor on her sixth birthday, and the hex color #663399 was named "rebeccapurple" and added to the CSS Colors list in her memory.

== Bibliography ==
- —— (2000). Cascading style sheets: the definitive guide. Sebastopol, Calif: O'Reilly Press. ISBN 978-0-596-00525-2. OCLC 54467242.
- —— (2001). Cascading style sheets 2.0: programmer's reference. New York: Osborne/McGraw-Hill. ISBN 978-0-07-213178-9.
- —— (2001). CSS pocket reference: visual styles for HTML. Beijing Köln: O'Reilly Press. ISBN 978-0-596-00120-9.
- —— (2002). Eric Meyer on CSS: mastering the language of Web design. Indianapolis, Ind: New Riders Press. ISBN 978-0-7357-1245-4.
- —— (2004). More Eric Meyer on CSS. Voices that matter. Indianapolis, Ind: New Riders Press. ISBN 978-0-7357-1425-0.
- ——; Wachter-Boettcher, Sara (2016). Design for real life. Brief books for people who make websites. New York: A Book Apart. ISBN 978-1-937557-40-9.
