= Web Standards Project =

Campaign for adoption of W3C web standards

- Type: Project
- Industry: Information technology
- Founded: 1998; 28 years ago
- Founder: George Olsen
- Defunct: 2013
- Fate: Dissolution
- Key people: Jeffrey Zeldman, Tim Bray, Glenn Davis, Steven Champeon, Eric Meyer, Tantek Çelik, Matt Mullenweg, Molly Holzschlag, Simon Willison, Dave Shea, Christopher Schmitt
- Website: www.webstandards.org

The Web Standards Project (WaSP) was a group of professional web developers dedicated to disseminating and encouraging the use of the web standards recommended by the World Wide Web Consortium, along with other groups and standards bodies, with a primary focus on web clients (web browsers).

Founded in 1998, The Web Standards Project campaigned for standards that reduced the cost and complexity of development while increasing the accessibility and long-term viability of any document published on the Web. WaSP worked with browser companies, authoring tool makers, and peers to encourage them to use these standards, since they "are carefully designed to deliver the greatest benefits to the greatest number of web users". The group dissolved in 2013.

== Organization ==
The Web Standards Project began as a grassroots coalition "fighting for standards in our [web] browsers" founded by George Olsen, Glenn Davis, and Jeffrey Zeldman in August 1998. By 2001, the group had achieved its primary goal of persuading Microsoft, Netscape, Opera, and other browser makers to accurately and completely support HTML 4.01/XHTML 1.0, CSS1, and ECMAScript. Had browser makers not been persuaded to do so, the Web would likely have fractured into pockets of incompatible content, with various websites available only to people who possessed the right browser. In addition to streamlining web development and significantly lowering its cost, support for common web standards enabled the development of the semantic web. By marking up content in semantic (X)HTML, front-end developers make a site's content more available to search engines, more accessible to people with disabilities, and more available to the world beyond the desktop (e.g. mobile).

The project re-launched in June 2002 with new members, a redesigned website, new site features, and a redefined mission focused on developer education and standards compliance in authoring tools as well as browsers.

Project leaders were:

- George Olsen (1998—1999)
- Jeffrey Zeldman (1999—2002)
- Steven Champeon (2002—2004)
- Molly Holzschlag (2004—2006)
- Kimberly Blessing and Drew McLellan (2006—2008)
- Derek Featherstone, Aaron Gustafson, and Glenda Sims (2008—2013)

There were members that were invited to work on ad hoc initiatives, the Buzz Blog and other content areas of the site.

The group announced its dissolution on March 1, 2013.

=== Task forces ===
The Web Standards Project hosted projects focused on bringing relevant organizations closer to standards-compliance, dubbed Task Forces.

Adobe Task Force
Focused on improving web standards compliance in products from Adobe Systems. Was named the Dreamweaver Task Force until 2008-03-10.
Education Task Force
Worked with institutions of higher education to promote instruction of Web standards and standards-compliant public sites.
Microsoft Task Force
Worked with the Internet Explorer and Web platform tools team.
Accessibility Task Force
Worked with organizations, vendors and others to promote Web accessibility.
International Liaison Group
A member was "an active advocate for Web standards and best practices either in their country of origin or domicile."
The Street Team
Organized community events to promote web standards.
DOM Scripting Task Force
Focused on interoperable client-side scripting, through explaining and promoting the DOM standards from W3C and the ECMAScript Standard, and concepts like progressive enhancement, graceful degradation, accessibility, standards-driven JavaScript. These best practice approaches have been called "DOM scripting" to differentiate them from earlier perceived bad uses of "Dynamic HTML". The task force became inactive before the group disbanded.

== Activities ==
- The Acid1 test allows browsers and other rendering engines to test compliance with HTML 4 and CSS 1 specifications.
- The Acid2 test allows browsers and other rendering engines to test compliance with CSS 1 and 2 specifications.
- The Acid3 test allows browsers and other rendering engines to test compliance with CSS 2.1, DOM, and EcmaScript specifications.
- The Web Compatibility Test for Mobile Browsers allows mobile browsers and other rendering engines to test for web page rendering issues.

=== Browse Happy ===
Browse Happy is a website urging users to upgrade their web browsers. The site was initially created by the Web Standards Project in August 2004 to convince users to switch to a web browser other than Microsoft's Internet Explorer. It focused on security issues in Internet Explorer and suggested four alternatives: Mozilla Firefox, Opera, Safari and Google Chrome. The core of the site was a collection of testimonials by people who had switched from Internet Explorer to alternative web browsers.

In June 2005, the Web Standards Project decided that an anti-Internet Explorer campaign did not fit with their mission, and they handed the site over to Matt Mullenweg. Since then, the site has been maintained by WordPress.com with collaboration from HTML5 Boilerplate team members.

== See also ==
- A List Apart
- WebPlatform
- CSS Zen Garden
