= Web standards =

Technical standard

Web standards are the formal, non-proprietary standards and other technical specifications that define and describe aspects of the World Wide Web. In recent years, the term has been more frequently associated with the trend of endorsing a set of standardized best practices for building web sites, and a philosophy of web design and development that includes those methods.

== Overview ==
Web standards include many interdependent standards and specifications, some of which govern aspects of the Internet, not just the World Wide Web. Even when not web-focused, such standards directly or indirectly affect the development and administration of web sites and web services. Considerations include the interoperability, accessibility and usability of web pages and web sites.

Web standards consist of the following:

- Recommendations published by the World Wide Web Consortium (W3C), such as HTML/XHTML, Cascading Style Sheets (CSS), image formats such as Portable Network Graphics (PNG) and Scalable Vector Graphics (SVG), as well as accessibility technologies like WAI-ARIA
- Standards and "Living standards" published by the Web Hypertext Application Technology Working Group (WHATWG), such as the HTML Living Standard, DOM Standard, Encoding Standard and URL Standard.
- Standards published by Ecma International (formerly ECMA) such as JavaScript (also known as ECMAScript) and JavaScript Object Notation (JSON)
- Standards published by the International Organization for Standardization (ISO), such as JPEG

More broadly, the following technologies may be referred to as "web standards" as well:

- Request for Comments (RFC) documents published by the Internet Engineering Task Force (IETF)
- The Unicode Standard and various Unicode Technical Reports (UTRs) published by the Unicode Consortium
- Name and number registries maintained by the Internet Assigned Numbers Authority (IANA)

Web standards are evolving specifications of web technologies. Web standards are developed by standards organizations—groups of interested and often competing parties chartered with the task of standardization—not technologies developed and declared to be a standard by a single individual or company. It is crucial to distinguish those specifications that are under development from the ones that already reached the final development status (in case of W3C specifications, the highest maturity level).

== The web standards movement ==
The earliest visible manifestation of the web standards movement was the Web Standards Project, launched in August 1998 as a grassroots coalition fighting for improved web standards support in browsers.

The web standards movement supports concepts of standards-based web design, including the separation of document structure from a web page or application's appearance and behavior; an emphasis on semantically structured content that validates (that is, contains no errors of structural composition) when tested against validation software maintained by the World Wide Web Consortium; and progressive enhancement, a layered approach to web page and application creation that enables all people and devices to access the content and functionality of a page, regardless of personal physical ability (accessibility), connection speed, and browser capability.

Prior to the web standards movement, many web page developers used invalid, incorrect HTML syntax such as "table layouts" and "spacer" GIF images to create web pages — an approach often referred to as "tag soup". Such pages sought to look the same in all browsers of a certain age (such as Microsoft Internet Explorer 4 and Netscape Navigator 4), but were often inaccessible to people with disabilities. Tag soup pages also displayed or operated incorrectly in older browsers, and required code forks such as JavaScript for Netscape Navigator and JScript for Internet Explorer that added to the cost and complexity of development. The extra code required, and the lack of a caching page layout language, made web sites "heavy" in terms of bandwidth, as did the frequent use of images as text. These bandwidth requirements were burdensome to users in developing countries, rural areas, and wherever fast Internet connections were unavailable.

The Web Standards movement pioneered by Glenn Davis, George Olsen, Jeffrey Zeldman, Steven Champeon, Todd Fahrner, Eric A. Meyer, Tantek Çelik, Dori Smith, Tim Bray, Jeffrey Veen, and other members of the Web Standards Project replaced bandwidth-heavy tag soup with light, semantic markup and progressive enhancement, with the goal of making web content "accessible to all".

The Web Standards movement declared that HTML, CSS, and JavaScript were more than simply interesting technologies. "They are a way of creating Web pages that will facilitate the twin goals of sophisticated and appropriate presentation and widespread accessibility." The group succeeded in persuading Netscape, Microsoft, and other browser makers to support these standards in their browsers. It then set about promoting these standards to designers, who were still using tag soup, Adobe Flash, and other proprietary technologies to create web pages.

In 2007, Douglas Vos initiated the Blue Beanie Day, inspired by Jeffrey Zeldman, who is shown with a blue cap on the book cover of his 2003 book Designing with Web Standards. Since then, the 30 November is the annual international celebration of web standards and web accessibility.

== Common usage ==
When a web site or web page is described as complying with web standards, it usually means that the site or page has valid HTML, CSS and JavaScript. The HTML should also meet accessibility and semantic guidelines. Full standard compliance also covers proper settings for character encoding, valid RSS or valid Atom news feed, valid RDF, valid metadata, valid XML, valid object embedding, valid script embedding, browser- and resolution-independent codes, and proper server settings.

When web standards are discussed, the following publications are typically seen as foundational:

- Recommendations for markup languages, such as Hypertext Markup Language (HTML), Extensible Hypertext Markup Language (XHTML), and Scalable Vector Graphics (SVG) from W3C.
- Recommendations for stylesheets, especially Cascading Style Sheets (CSS), from W3C.
- Standards for ECMAScript, more commonly JavaScript, from Ecma International.
- Recommendations for Document Object Models (DOM), from W3C.
- Properly formed names and addresses for the page and all other resources referenced from it (URIs), based upon RFC 2396, from IETF.
- Proper use of HTTP and MIME to deliver the page, return data from it and to request other resources referenced in it, based on RFC 2616, from IETF.

Web accessibility is normally based upon the Web Content Accessibility Guidelines published by the W3C's Web Accessibility Initiative.

Work in the W3C toward the Semantic Web is currently focused by publications related to the Resource Description Framework (RDF), Gleaning Resource Descriptions from Dialects of Languages (GRDDL) and Web Ontology Language (OWL).

== Standards publications and bodies ==
A W3C recommendation is a specification or set of guidelines that, after extensive consensus-building, has received the endorsement of W3C members and the director.

An IETF Internet Standard is characterized by a high degree of technical maturity and by a generally held belief that the specified protocol or service provides significant benefit to the Internet community. A specification that reaches the status of Standard is assigned a number in the IETF STD series while retaining its original IETF RFC number.

== Non-standard and vendor-proprietary pressures ==
HTML 5 contains numerous "willful violations" of other specifications, in order to accommodate limitations of existing platforms.

== Web Standards Compliance Testing ==
There are compliance tests both for HTML code generated by websites as well as for the faithful interpretation of HTML code by web browsers.

=== Compliance tests for website code ===
W3C offers online services to test websites directly for both web site developers, as well as for website users. These include:

- Markup Validation Service to check the markup (HTML, XHTML, ...) of Web documents
- CSS Validation Service to check Cascading Style Sheets (CSS) and (X)HTML documents with style sheets

=== Compliance tests for web browsers ===
The Web Standards Project (WaSP), although development is officially inactive, continues to offer two levels of testing services for web browsers:

- Acid2 Browser Test
- Acid3 Browser Test

== See also ==
- Acid3
- Designing with Web Standards
- Open Web Foundation (OWF)
- Responsive web design (RWD)
- W3C Markup Validation Service
- WebPlatform.org
- Web Standards Project
