= Rachel Andrew =

British web developer

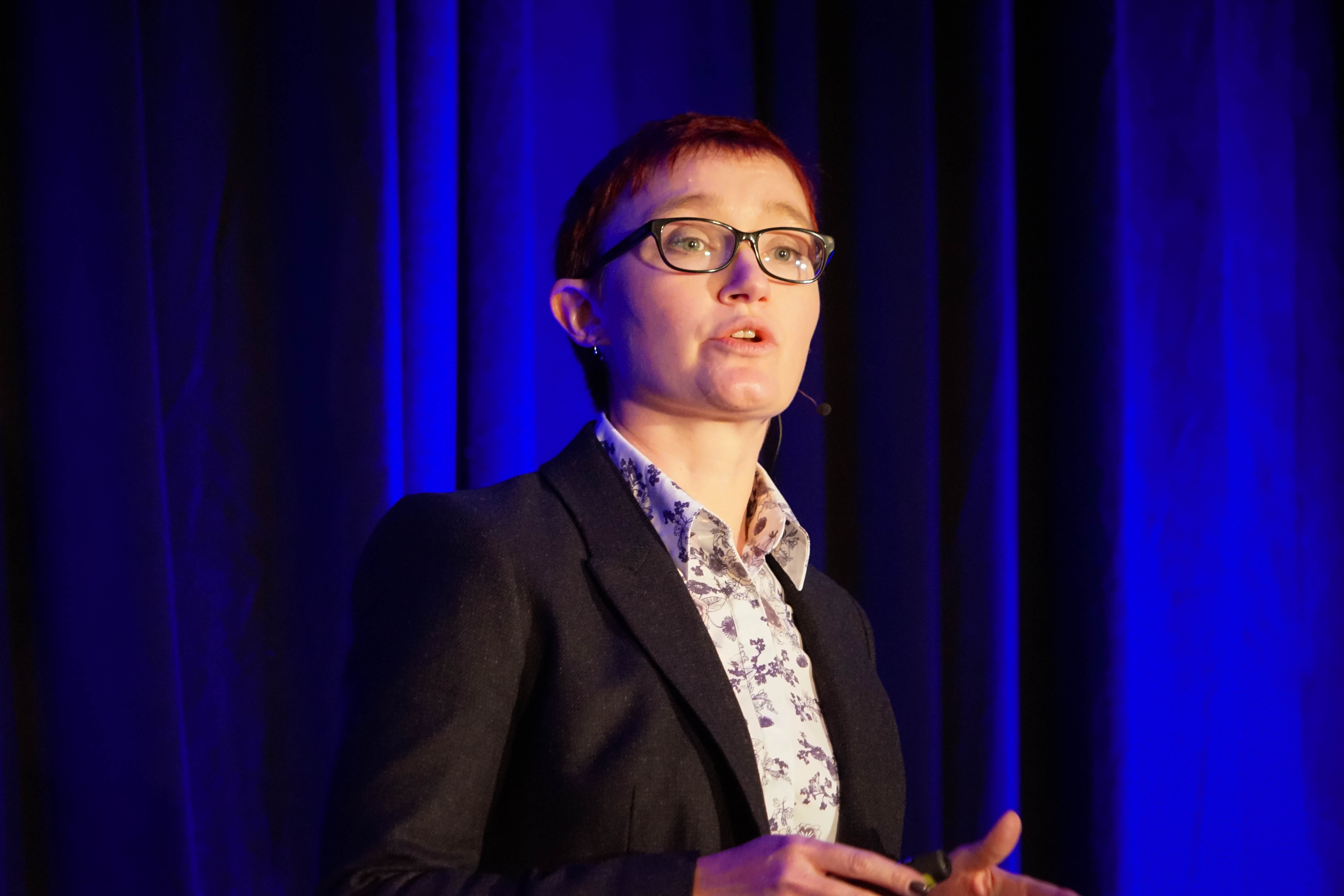
- in 2015
- Education: Open University
- Occupations: Author; Web Developer
- Known for: CSS expertise
- Children: 1
- Website: rachelandrew.co.uk

Rachel Andrew is a British web developer, author and speaker. She is an Invited Expert to the World Wide Web Consortium (W3C) CSS Working Group, Google Developer Expert, and a former member of the Web Standards Project. She is the editor-in-chief of Smashing Magazine.

== Education ==
Andrew took online courses at Open University, earning a First Class degree in Humanities with Religious Studies.

== Career ==
Andrew began working as a web developer in 1996 at a .com company that folded during the Dot-com bubble burst. She said that she became self-employed afterward because it was more stable.

In 2001, she founded edgeofmyseat.com, the web development company behind Perch CMS, a content management system, and Notist, an application for building public speaking portfolios.

Andrew is a Technical Writer at Google, and works on MDN Web Docs on behalf of Google and Mozilla.

Andrew has authored or co-authored more than twenty books about web development. She is also a regular contributor to A List Apart, and speaker (notably at An Event Apart).

=== Books ===
- Rachel Andrew. The New CSS Layout. A Book Apart. Published:Oct 10, 2017. ISBN 978-1-937557-68-3
- Jeremy Keith, Rachel Andrew. HTML5 for Web Designers. A Book Apart. Published:First Ed. May 4, 2010; Second Ed. Feb 17, 2016. ISBN 978-1-9375572-4-9
- Rachel Andrew. Get Ready For CSS Grid Layout. A Book Apart. Published:Jan 7, 2016. ISBN 978-1-937557-26-3
- Rachel Andrew. The Profitable Side Project Handbook. Publication date: January 2014. Author website.
- Rachel Andrew. CSS3 Layout Modules. Publication date: August 2014. Author website.
- Harry Roberts, Nicholas C. Zakas, Christian Heilmann, Tim Kadlec, Mat Marquis, Addy Osmani, Aaron Gustafson, Paul Tero, Rachel Andrew, Nishant Kothary, Christopher Murphy. Perspectives on Web Design. Publication date: November 2013. ISBN (PDF): 978-3-94454060-3. ISBN (EPUB): 978-3-94454058-0. ISBN (KINDLE): 978-3-94454059-7. ISBN (Print): 978-3-94454057-3
- Rachel Andrew. The CSS3 Anthology (4th Edition). SitePoint Pty Ltd. Publication date: March 2012
- Elliot Jay Stocks, Paul Boag, Rachel Andrew, Ben Schwarz, Lea Verou, David Storey, Christian Heilmann, Dmitry Fadeyev, Marc Edwards, Aaron Walter, Aral Balkan, Stephen Hay, Andy Clarke. The Smashing Book 3 - Redesign the Web. Published by Smashing Magazine. Publication date: May 2012
- Rachel Andrew. The CSS Anthology (3rd Edition). SitePoint Pty Ltd. Publication date: August 2009
- Rachel Andrew, Kevin Yank. Everything You Know About CSS is Wrong. SitePoint Pty Ltd. Publication date: October 2008
- Rachel Andrew, Dan Shafer. HTML Utopia: Designing Without Tables Using CSS (2nd Edition). SitePoint Pty Ltd. Publication date: April 2006
- Rachel Andrew. Build Your Own Standards Compliant Website Using Dreamweaver 8. SitePoint Pty Ltd. Publication date: September 2005
- Rachel Andrew. The CSS Anthology: 101 Essential Tips, Tricks & Hacks (2nd Edition). SitePoint Pty Ltd. Publication date: August 2007
- Rachel Andrew. The CSS Anthology: 101 Essential Tips, Tricks & Hacks (1st Edition). SitePoint Pty Ltd. Publication date: August 2004
- Costas Hadjisotiriou, Kevin Marshall, Rachel Andrew. ASP.NET Web Development with Macromedia Dreamweaver MX 2004. Apress. Publication date: April 2004
- Rachel Andrew, Rob Turnbull, Alan Foley, Drew McLellan. ASP Web Development with Macromedia Dreamweaver MX 2004. Apress. Publication date: February 2004
- Rachel Andrew, Allan Kent, David Powers. PHP Web Development with Macromedia Dreamweaver MX 2004. Apress. Publication date: July 2004
- Rachel Andrew, Craig Grannell, Allan Kent, Christopher Schmitt. Dreamweaver MX 2004 Design Projects. Friends of Ed (Publisher). Publication date: October 2004
- Rachel Andrew, Gareth Downes-Powell, Nancy Gill, Kevin Marshall, Drew McLellan. The Dreamweaver Developer’s Instant Troubleshooter. Apress. Publication date: July 2003
- Rachel Andrew, Christopher Schmitt, Allan Kent, Craig Grannell. Dreamweaver MX Design Projects. Glasshaus (Publisher). Publication date: January 2003
- Rachel Andrew, Crystal Waters, Chris Ullman. Fundamental Web Design and Development Skills. Glasshaus (Publisher). Publication date: September 2003
- Rachel Andrew, Alan Foley, Omar Elbaga, Rob Turnbull, Bob Regan. Dynamic Dreamweaver MX. Glasshaus (Publisher). Publication date: July 2002

== Personal life ==
Andrew left school at age 16, reporting that her General Certificates of Secondary Education (GCSEs) were "dreadful". She originally trained to be a dancer and choreographer, and worked backstage in the theatre as a carpenter. At age 22, Andrew became pregnant and started freelancing as a typist, processing documents like Curriculum Vitaes (CVs).

During her time as a typist, Andrew spent time on internet forums to connect with other parents, and learned HTML from the other participants. She later taught herself other programming languages and started working as a web developer.

Andrew lives in Bristol, United Kingdom and has a daughter.
