= Lea Verou =

Greek web developer

- Λία Βέρου
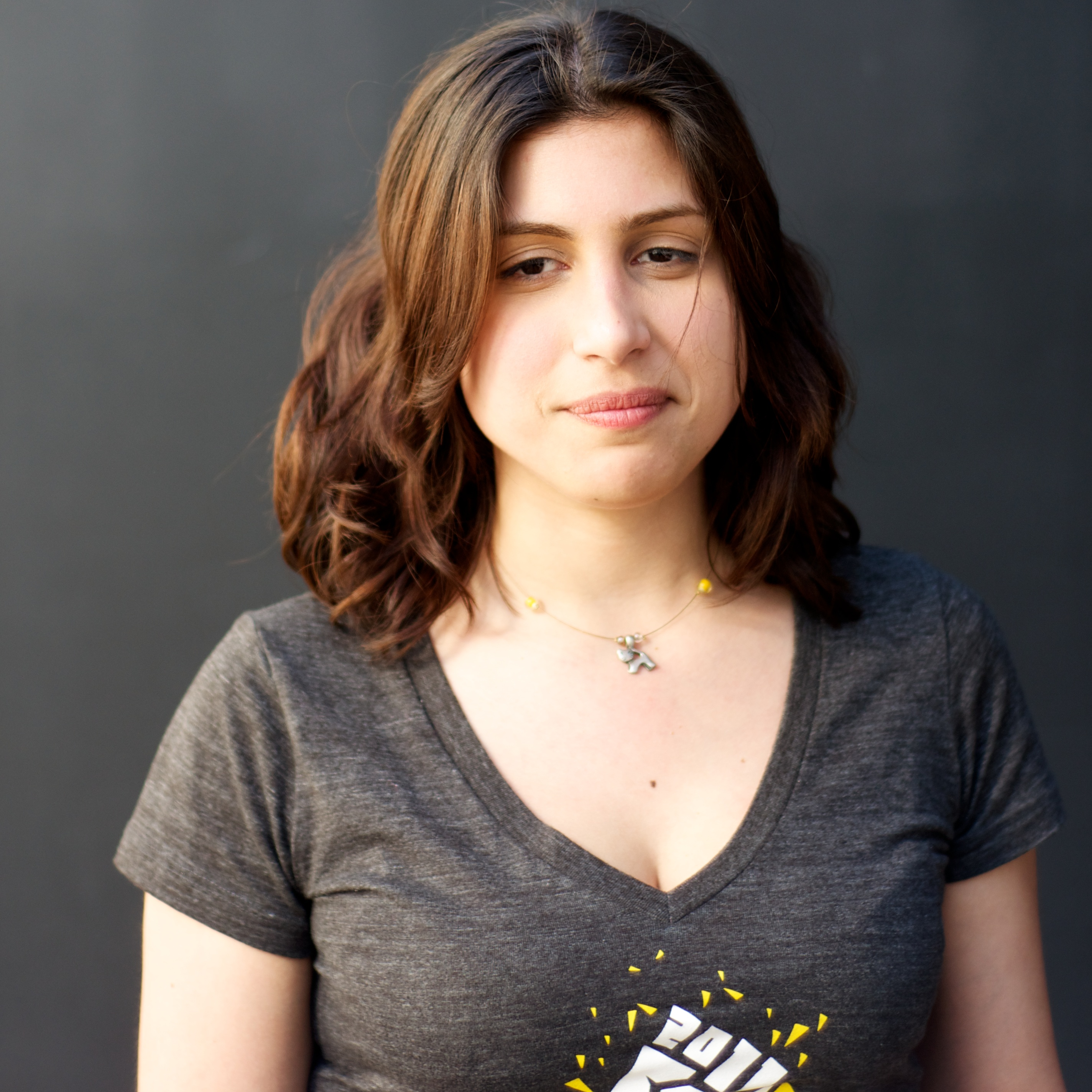
- Verou in 2012
- Born: Greek: Μιχαήλια Κομβούτη-Βέρου
- Education: Massachusetts Institute of Technology; Athens University of Economics and Business
- Occupations: Computer scientist, speaker, author
- Scientific career
- Fields: Human-Computer Interaction; End user programming World Wide Web; Semantic Web
- Doctoral advisor: David Karger
- Website: https://lea.verou.me

Lea Verou (Greek: Λία Βέρου) is a Greek-American computer scientist, front end web developer, speaker and author, originally from Lesbos, Greece. Verou is currently a research assistant at Massachusetts Institute of Technology (MIT) Computer Science and Artificial Intelligence Laboratory (CSAIL), an elected participant in the World Wide Web Consortium (W3C) Technical Architecture Group (TAG), and an invited expert in the W3C CSS Working Group. She is the author of the book CSS Secrets: Better Solutions to Everyday Web Design Problems (ISBN 978-1-449-37263-7).

== Education ==
Verou earned her Bachelor of Science degree in computer science from Athens University of Economics and Business. She had previously attended Aristotle University of Thessaloniki studying electrical engineering and computer science. She later earned a Master of Science degree in computer science from MIT. Since 2014, she has been a Doctor of Philosophy (PhD) candidate at MIT in electrical engineering and computer science.

Her background encompasses both technical development and visual design.

== Career ==
Verou at a talk on CSS in 2014

Verou started her career as a freelancer in 2005 while she was in university. In 2008, she co-founded a Greek web development company called Fresset Ltd, which managed a number of Greek community websites that she and her co-founder had created. The company was sold in 2013. In 2012, Verou joined W3C as a Developer Advocate.

=== Open source work ===
During the course of her studies and career, Verou has started over thirty open-source software projects, including PrismJS, a popular syntax highlighter, and Mavo, her research project at MIT.

=== Conference speaking ===
Verou has spoken at over a hundred conferences, including Smashing Magazine's conference SmashingConf, A List Apart's conference An Event Apart, South by Southwest (SXSW), and jQuery's conference.

Her talks are known for their distinctive style involving live coding through a custom presentation framework that she built to optimize the experience for the audience.

=== Bibliography and publications ===
Her first book, CSS Secrets: Better Solutions to Everyday Web Design Problems was published by O'Reilly Media in 2015. It sold thousands of copies and was translated into 8 languages. In 2020, it was named "The Best CSS Book" by the Chicago Tribune.

Prior to that, Verou had co-authored a chapter in the book Smashing Book #3: Redesign the Web in 2012.

Since 2011, she has written dozens of articles, including bylines in .net Magazine, Smashing Magazine, CSS-Tricks, A List Apart, and Web Almanac. In 2017, Verou co-authored her first CSS Specification with Tab Atkins Jr., and Elika J. Etemad, and has since co-authored four others.

She has also co-authored four peer-reviewed scientific papers as part of her research at MIT, published in ACM UIST and ACM CSCW.

=== Teaching ===
Verou's teaching career began when she was still an undergraduate in Athens University of Economics and Business, where she co-organized a 4th year undergraduate course about web development together with Prof. Vasilis Vassalos.

In spring 2018, she co-taught User Interface Design & Implementation at Massachusetts Institute of Technology (MIT), with David Karger and Amy X. Zhang. In spring 2020, together with her advisor, David Karger, she co-created and co-taught a new course at MIT that combined human-computer interaction (HCI) with web programming called 6.S082 Design for the Web: Languages and User interfaces. The course is being taught again in spring 2022.
