= Jen Simmons =

Web designer and developer

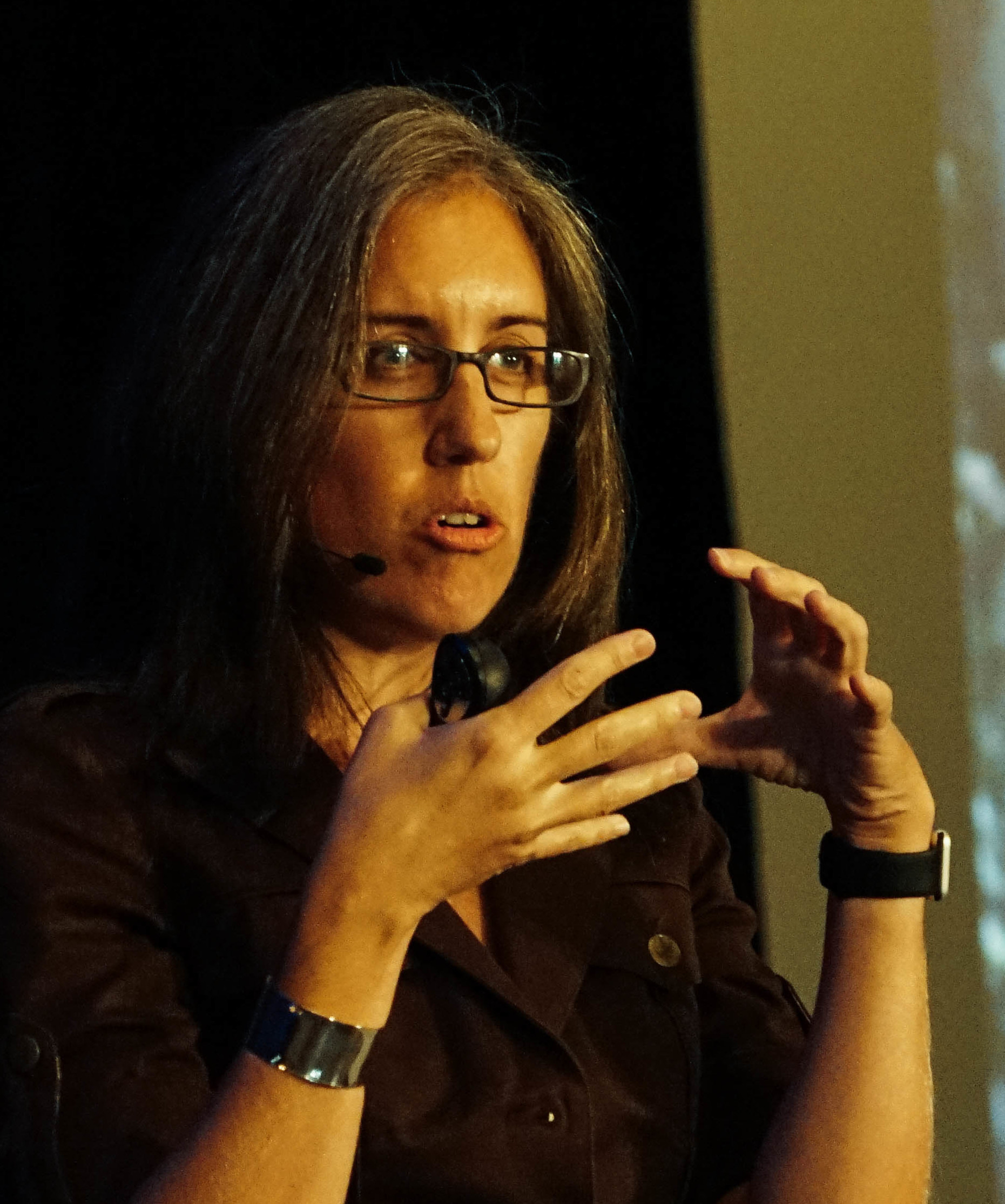
- Simmons presenting at An Event Apart in 2015
- Education: Gordon College (BA); Temple University (MFA)
- Occupations: graphic designer, web developer
- Website: jensimmons.com

Jen Simmons is an American graphic designer, web developer, educator and speaker with expertise in web standards, particularly HTML and CSS. She is a member of the CSS Working Group and has been prominent in the deployment of CSS grid layout. She worked as a developer advocate at Mozilla and later at Apple.

== Life ==
Simmons earned a BA in sociology from Gordon College in 1991. In 2007 she graduated from Temple University with an MFA in Film and Media Arts. In addition to working on websites since 1998, Simmons is a designer for print pieces and live performance, including projection and lighting design work.

She is a creator of Bartik theme for Drupal, which became one of core themes and a default in Drupal versions 7, 8 and 9.

In 2013 she joined the Responsive Images Community Group one of groups of the World Wide Web Consortium (W3C).

She was a designer and developer advocate at Mozilla since 2016, where she designed the Firefox browser's Grid Inspector. Since 2020, Simmons is a developer advocate at Apple for the Web Developer Experience team for WebKit and Safari.

Simmons is a member of the CSS Working Group created by the W3C since 2016. She joined CSS WG when working for Mozilla and continued as an Apple employee. She helped prepare and communicate CSS grid layout specification (level 1 and 2), CSS Containment Module Level 3, CSS Cascading and Inheritance (level 5 and 6), CSS Shapes Module Level 1. She was an editor on CSS Box Sizing Module level 4 and on CSS Grid Layout Level 3.

== Significance ==
Simmons runs the YouTube channel "Layout Land" and coined the term "intrinsic design" to refer to her philosophy of web layouts that mix fixed, content-sized, and fluid layout. She is a frequent conference speaker at events such as South by Southwest, DrupalCon and SmashingConf.

Simmons has been on Twitter since 2007 and has more than 100,000 followers. In 2007, she coined the term "fail whale" for the website's error message illustration that showed during outages until 2013.
