= User interface style sheet language =

A User interface stylesheet language is a stylesheet language which is meant to be applied to graphical computer user interfaces. They primarily act as subsidiary languages to style UI elements which are either programmed or marked-up (as in XML-based markup languages).

== Examples ==
- Cascading Style Sheets as used in Mozilla's XUL user interface
- Qt Style Sheets as used in KDE4
- Robert Staudinger's CSS theming for GTK+
