= WebPlatform.org =

Community-edited reference of web standards

- Website type: Resource
- Dissolved: September 2015
- Owners: Adobe Systems, Apple Inc., Facebook, Google, HP, Microsoft, Mozilla, Nokia, Opera Software, and W3C
- Website: webplatform.org
- Commercial: No
- Registration: Optional
- Launched: October 8, 2012; 13 years ago
- Content license: Creative Commons Attribution
- Written in: PHP

WebPlatform.org (or WebPlatform) was a community-edited documentation website spun off by W3C. It sought to create a vendor-neutral online reference of Web platform standards. The project was a collaboration among Adobe Systems, Apple Inc., Facebook, Google, HP, Microsoft, Mozilla, Nokia, Opera Software, and W3C, who were called "stewards" of the WebPlatform project.

== Details ==
WebPlatform.org was an open community of developers building resources for a better web, regardless of brand, browser, or platform. Anyone could contribute to the reference, by collaborating on the wiki documentation pages (WebPlatform Docs), sharing and commenting on the WebPlatform blog posts, and communicating through the Internet Relay Chat (IRC) channel.

WebPlatform Docs used MediaWiki as its platform. The documentation contained sections titled Beginners Guide, General Web Concepts, HTML, CSS, Accessibility, JavaScript, DOM, API & SVG, originally imported from resources maintained by the involved parties.

In September 2015, WebPlatform project was discontinued because the stewards' partnership agreement ended. All of its content was "frozen" and archived.

New documentation can be found at MDN Web Docs.

== See also ==
- Web platform
- Web Standards Project (WaSP)
- MDN Web Docs
