= Argo (web browser) =

Early web browser

- Developer(s): Bert Bos
- Initial release: August 1994; 30 years ago
- Final release: ? / 2 July 1997; 27 years ago
- Operating system: HP-UX
- Available in: English
- Type: web browser
- License: W3C Software Notice and License/CERN open source copyright

Argo was part of a project to make the Internet accessible to scholars in the Humanities at the University of Groningen. The Argo web browser was created in August 1994 by Bert Bos.

There is presently no publicly available built version, although the source code is still available.

== History ==
The Argo browser was able to handle its own style sheet language called Stream-based Style Sheet Proposal (SSP) rendered mostly by Xlib/Xrm. SSP was general enough to be able to be applied to other markup languages in addition to HTML. In the development process of Cascading Style Sheets (CSS) Bos was one of the first people who decided to join Håkon Wium Lie. Although this early adoption SSP had other advanced features that could not be integrated in CSS1 and had to wait for CSS2. Arena and Argo were presented as a testbed at the World Wide Web Conference 3 on 10–14 April 1995 in Darmstadt

== Functionality ==
Argo based on the W3A, an API for WWW browser applets. The browser featured plug-in modules, or "applets", which allowed for the addition of new functionality without recompilation. Examples of such functionality provided by the applets includes adding support for the following:

- Bookmarks/history
- Cache/proxy support
- Data formats (e.g. ASCII, GIF, HTML, JPEG, XBM, XPM)
- Email clients (e.g. Mutt, Pine)
- Protocols: FTP, gopher, HTTP, NNTP, WAIS, local files
- Graphical navigation

The browser's kernel depended on the modules to provide such functionality.

== Technical ==
The browser was run on HP-UX and used dynamic loading to support its applets.

== See also ==
- Cascading Style Sheets
