= Bert Bos =

Dutch computer scientist

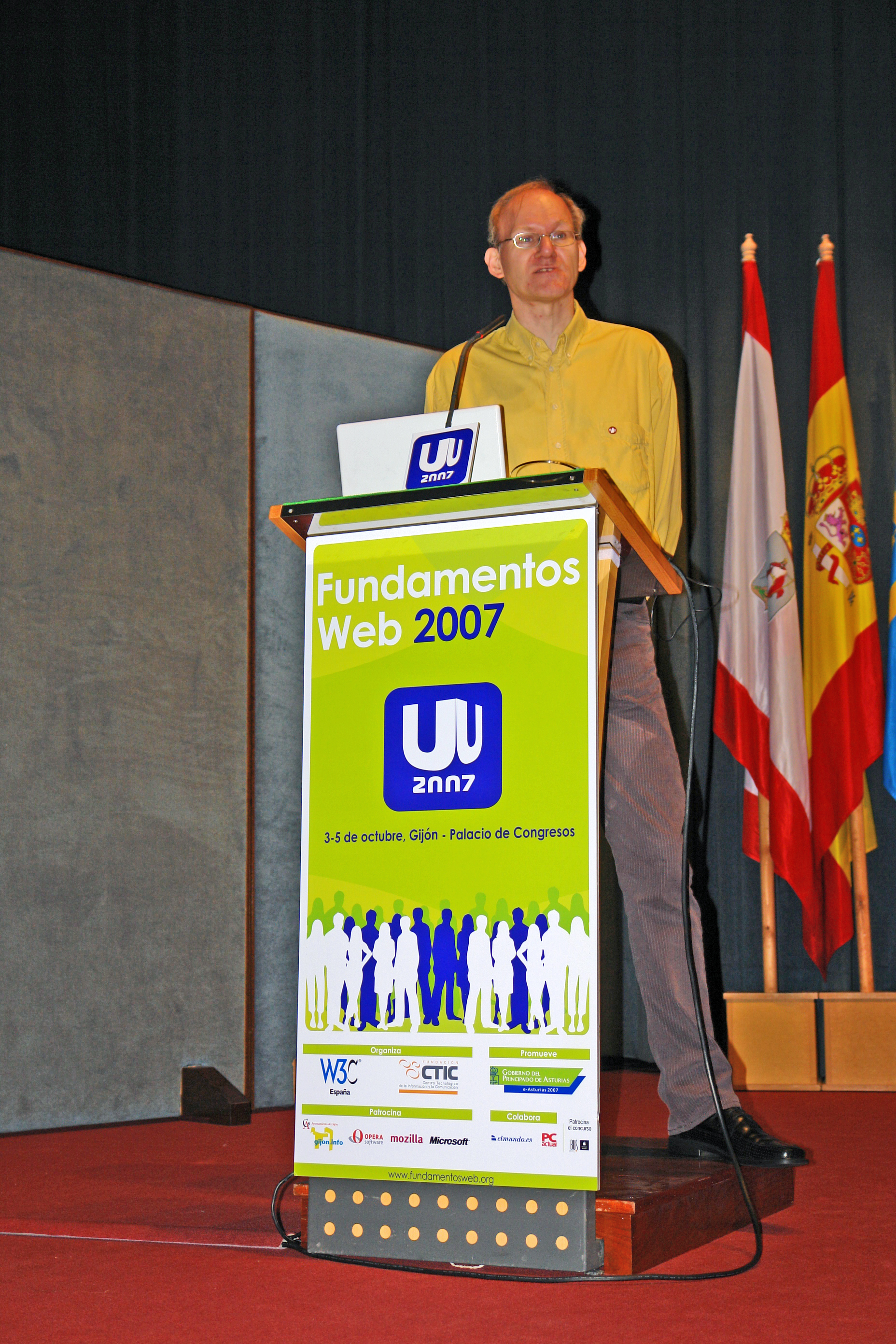
- Bert Bos
- Born: November 10, 1963 (age 61); The Hague, Netherlands
- Occupation: Computer scientist
- Known for: Cascading Style Sheets
- Website: www.w3.org/People/Bos/

Gijsbert (Bert) Bos (born 1963) is a Dutch computer scientist known for the development of Argo, a web browser he developed as test application for his style sheet proposal.

== Life and work ==
Born in The Hague, Bos studied mathematics at the University of Groningen, and wrote his PhD thesis on Rapid user interface development with the script language Gist.

In 1996, he joined the World Wide Web Consortium (W3C) to work on Cascading Style Sheets (CSS). He is a former chairman and the current W3C Staff Contact of the CSS Working Group. He is based in Sophia Antipolis, France.

== Selected publications ==
Bos has, along with Håkon Wium Lie, written a book about Cascading Style Sheets.

- Cascading Style Sheets: Designing for the Web, ISBN 0-201-41998-X
- Cascading Style Sheets: Designing for the Web (2nd Edition), ISBN 0-201-59625-3
- Cascading Style Sheets: Designing for the Web (3rd Edition), ISBN 0-321-19312-1
