= Igalia =

Spanish software consulting company

- Company type: S.L.
- Industry: Software Consulting
- Founded: September 2001; 24 years ago
- Headquarters: Bugallal Marchesi, 22, 1º A Coruña - Galicia
- Area served: Worldwide
- Products: WebKitGTK, WPE, GStreamer, GNOME Web (also known as Epiphany), Orca (assistive technology)
- Services: Open source consultancy and engineering
- Number of employees: > 100
- Website: www.igalia.com

Igalia is a private, worker-owned, employee-run cooperative model consultancy focused on open source software. Based in A Coruña, Galicia (Spain), Igalia is known for its contributions and commitments to both open-source and open standards. Igalia's primary focus is on open source solutions for a large set of hardware and software platforms centering on browsers, graphics, multimedia, compilers, virtualization, embedded Linux, and device drivers.

== History ==
Igalia is a Spanish software consultancy.

In February 2023, Mozilla began directing the users of its VR web browser, Firefox Reality, to use Igalia's then upcoming open source browser Wolvic instead. While Firefox Reality was being shut down, Wolvic is based on Firefox Reality's source code. Initially, the Wolvic browser was set to run on Oculus, HTC Vive Focus, Pico Interactive, Daydream, Huawei VR Glasses and open source Lynx devices. It launched later in the month as a beta. Igalia said it had secured partial funding to work on the browser project for two years.

In September 2023, it was announced that Valve Software and Igalia were partnering on the Linux-based OS of the Steam Deck handheld games console. The Steam OS 3.0 used Arch Linux instead of Debian. Noted The Register about the partnership, "Valve is a highly atypical company; its uniquely flat management structure is even the subject of academic study. Igalia, too, is a flat, worker-owned cooperative. "

== Active projects ==
Igalia is the current core maintainer of several projects, including:

- Two official WebKit ports
  - WebKit WPE, a WebKit port optimized for embedded devices
  - WebKitGTK, the GTK port of the WebKit web rendering engine used in GNOME desktop applications.
- GNOME Web (formerly known as Epiphany), the GNOME web browser
- Orca, a screen reader that provides access to the graphical Linux desktop via user-customizable combinations of speech and braille.
- Wolvic, a web browser built for extended reality.

Igalia is a major contributor to each of the major Web engines (Blink, Gecko/Servo and WebKit). In 2019 they were the #2 committers to both the WebKit and Chromium codebases and in the top 10 contributors to Gecko/Servo. Igalia has helped the interoperability of some features across web engines; they implemented CSS Grid Layout in WebKit and Blink. They are maintainers for several areas of the Chromium codebase, such as CSS Grid Layout, MathML, and Ozone-Wayland.

Igalia also has significant participation in open source communities, contributing to several projects, such as Mesa, GStreamer, Node.js, and Wayland.

== Past projects and historical involvement ==
Igalia was previously significantly involved in:

- Maemo and MeeGo. Igalia developers authored Grilo (a framework for the access to multimedia sources like YouTube, Flickr, Jamendo, and others), and managed LibrePlan (a project management web application), OCRFeeder (an OCR suite for GNOME) and Skeltrack (a Free Software library for skeleton tracking from depth images).

== Memberships ==
Igalia maintains active memberships and participation in a number of foundations and standards consortia:

- R-Car Consortium Partners
- Linux Foundation, including the Automotive Grade Linux (AGL) and Servo projects.
- A founder of the GNOME Mobile & Embedded Initiative.
- The World Wide Web Consortium (W3C) — Igalia is a member since 2013.
- The Khronos Group.
- ECMA International — Igalia is a member since 2018 where they participate in TC39.
- WHATWG.
- GENIVI® Alliance.
- The Software Freedom Conservancy (SFC).
- The Electronic Frontier Foundation (EFF).
- AGASOL.
- Past member of the GNOME Foundation Advisory Board.
