= MDN Web Docs =

Documentation center on web technologies

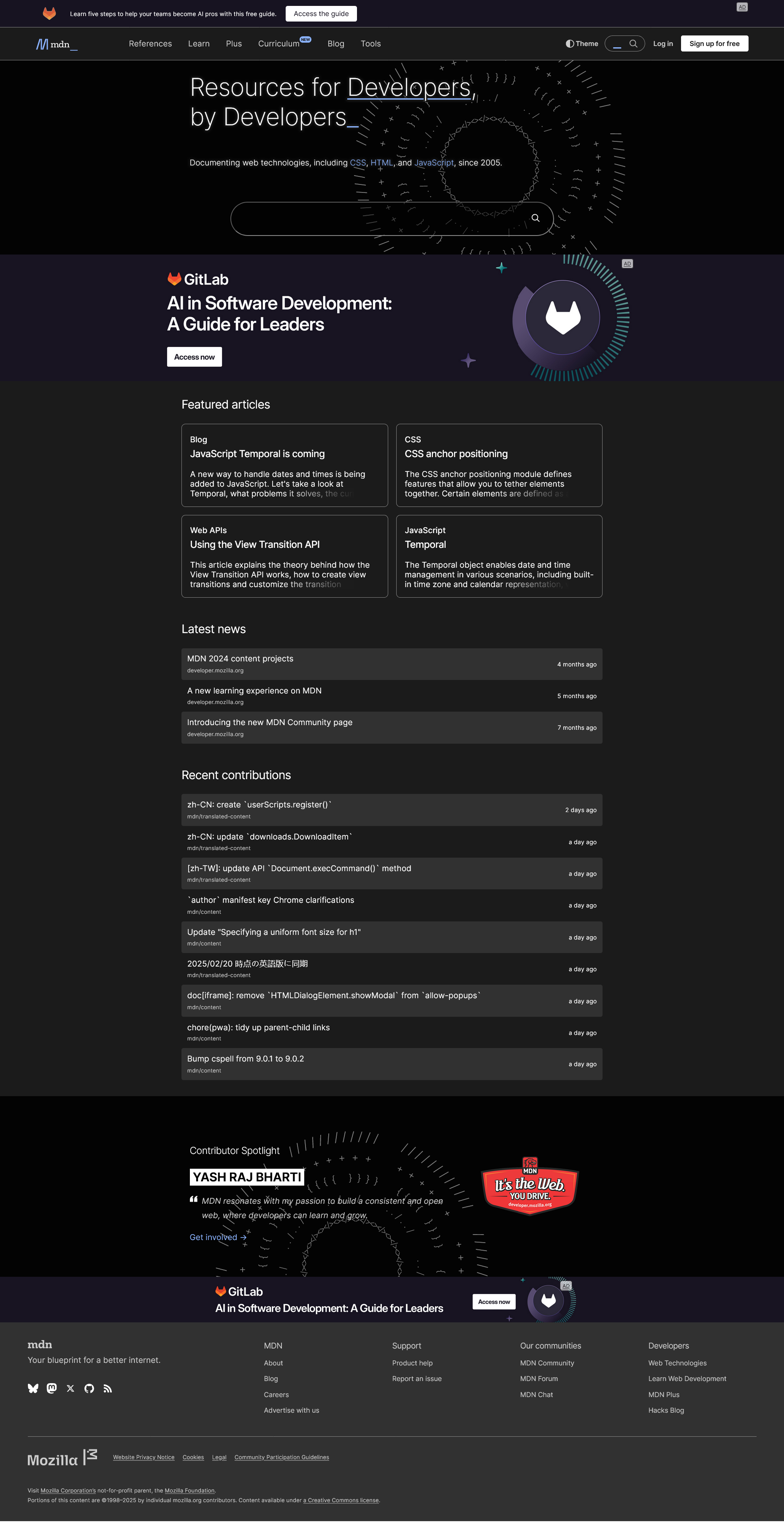
- Screenshot of MDN Web Docs, screenshot in May 2025
- Native name: Mozilla Developer Network
- Former name: Mozilla Developer Center
- Website type: Wiki
- Available in: English; Chinese; French; Japanese; Korean; Portuguese; Russian; Spanish
- Owner: Mozilla
- Industry: open-source software development
- Website: developer.mozilla.org
- Commercial: No
- Registration: Optional, required to edit content
- Launched: 2005; 21 years ago
- Current status: Online
- Content license: CC BY-SA v2.5+ et al.
- Written in: React; SCSS; JSX; JavaScript; Python

MDN Web Docs, previously Mozilla Developer Network and formerly Mozilla Developer Center, is a documentation repository and learning resource for web developers. It was started by Mozilla in 2005 as a unified place for documentation about open web standards, Mozilla's own projects, and developer guides.

MDN Web Docs content is maintained by Mozilla, Open Web Docs, and a volunteer community of developers and technical writers. It also contains content contributed by Microsoft, Google, and Samsung who, in 2017, announced they would shut down their own web documentation projects and move all their documentation to MDN Web Docs. Topics include HTML, JavaScript, CSS, Web APIs, PWAs, Django, Node.js, WebExtensions, MathML, WebAssembly, accessibility/ARIA, security, and others.

== History ==
In 2005, Mozilla Corporation started the project under the name Mozilla Developer Center, and still funds the servers and staff of its projects.

The initial content for the website was provided by DevEdge, for which the Mozilla Foundation was granted a license by AOL. The site now contains a mix of content migrated from DevEdge and mozilla.org, as well as original and more up-to-date content. Documentation was also migrated from XULPlanet.com.

On Oct 3, 2016, Brave browser added Mozilla Developer Network as one of its default search engines options.

In 2017, MDN Web Docs became the unified documentation of web technology for Google, Samsung, Microsoft, and Mozilla. Microsoft started redirecting pages from Microsoft Developer Network to MDN.

In 2019, Mozilla started Beta testing a new reader site for MDN Web Docs written in React (instead of jQuery; some jQuery functionality was replaced with Cheerio library). The new site was launched on December 14, 2020. Since December 14, 2020, all editable content is stored in a Git repository hosted on GitHub, where contributors open pull requests and discuss changes.

On January 25, 2021, the Open Web Docs (OWD) organization was launched as a non-profit fiscal entity to employ technical writers to work on MDN. As of January 2026, the top financial contributors of OWD are Microsoft, Sovereign Tech Agency, Igalia, and Google.

In March 2022, MDN launched a redesign with a new logo and a paid subscription called MDN Plus.

In August 2025, MDN launched a second major front-end rebuild, replacing the React-based single-page application architecture introduced in 2020 with server-side HTML templating and web components built using the Lit library. The redesign was undertaken to address slow build times and styling maintenance issues in the previous architecture, and prioritized Baseline "Widely available" web features when selecting which browser technologies to use for the new interface.

== See also ==
- WebPlatform.org
