= A List Apart =

Website about web design

- Website type: Webzine (electronic periodical publication)
- Available in: English, Arabic, Italian
- Creator: Jeffrey Zeldman
- Website: www.alistapart.com
- Registration: None
- Launched: 1997 (as a mailing list)* 1998 (as a webzine)
- Current status: Online
- ISSN: 1534-0295

A List Apart is a webzine that explores the design, development, and meaning of web content, with a special focus on web standards and best practices.

== History ==
A List Apart began in 1997 as a mailing list for web designers, moderated and published by Jeffrey Zeldman and Brian Platz.

Founder's notes, by Zeldman:

In 1997, web developer Brian M. Platz and I started the A List Apart mailing list because we found the web design mailing lists that were already out there to be too contentious, too careerist, or too scattershot. There was too much noise, too little signal. We figured, if we created something we liked better, maybe other people would like it too. Within months, 16,000 designers, developers, and content specialists had joined our list.

Editing was the key. Many members submitted comments and topics each day; we dumped the dross, published the gold, often selecting pieces for their thematic relevance to one another. Through editorial cultivation, we rapidly grew an intelligent and insightful community.

Zeldman transformed A List Apart into a web magazine in 1998. Noting that among the then existing web magazines, David Siegel’s High Five advocated graphic design and Wired’s Webmonkey taught web technologies, he observes:

Both magazines were great, both subject areas vital. But to me they were parts of a larger whole, incorporating writing, structure, community, and other bits nobody had quite put together. Then, too, no web design zine of the time seemed to grasp or value web standards the way I and my peeps at The Web Standards Project did.

The web site has had three major visual designs. The original, designed by Zeldman, featured custom club-flyer style graphics that accompanied each article. In early 2001, this design formed the basis of the site's conversion to one of the earliest CSS layouts on the web, establishing its reputation as "one of the leading sources of information and advocacy for CSS design and layout." The first major redesign, by Jason Santa Maria in 2005, featured a softer color palette. It also included Cascading Style Sheets by Eric Meyer and introduced custom illustrations by Kevin Cornell. The most recent update to the site, launched in January 2013, features a black-and-white design scheme by Mike Pick. It continues to prominently feature Cornell's illustrations, but takes a "content first" approach to design by reducing the presence of almost all brand and design elements in favor of article content.

== A List Apart: The Web Design Survey ==
From 2007 to 2011, A List Apart annually surveyed the web design and development community and presented its findings in a series of reports. These reports claimed to be the “first true picture” of the profession of web design as it is practiced worldwide. Topics covered include salary; title; educational background and its effect on salary, job satisfaction, and title; workplace discrimination by gender, age, and ethnicity; and more. Tens of thousands of respondents around the globe participated each year. The magazine provides anonymized raw data with each findings report so that readers may crunch their own numbers, verify A List Apart's findings, or conduct their own investigations.

- Findings from the 2007 survey (PDF): link
- Findings from the 2007 survey: link
- Findings from the 2008 survey: link
- Findings from the 2009 survey: link
- Findings from the 2010 survey: link
- Findings from the 2011 survey: link

== International editions ==
An official Arabic edition of A List Apart was launched on January 18, 2010. This is an authorized A List Apart publication, and was its first international edition.

Since then, an Italian version has launched as well.

== See also ==
- Web Standards Project
- CSS Zen Garden
