= Presentation semantics =

Concept in computer science

In computer science, particularly in human-computer interaction, presentation semantics specify how a particular piece of a formal language is displayed or represented in a distinguished manner accessible to human senses, usually human vision. For example, saying that <bold> ... </bold> must render the text between these constructs using some bold typeface is a specification of presentation semantics for that syntax.

Many markup languages, including HTML, DSSSL, and XSL-FO, have presentation semantics, but others, such as XML, do not. Character encoding standards, such as Unicode, also have presentation semantics.

One of the main goals of style sheet languages is to separate the syntax that defines document content from the syntax endowed with presentation semantics. This is the norm on the World Wide Web, where the Cascading Style Sheets language provides a large collection of presentation semantics for HTML documents.
