= Grilo =

Grilo is a Portuguese surname. Notable people with the surname include:

- Hugo Grilo (born 1986), Portuguese footballer
- João Mário Grilo (born 1958), Portuguese film director, author and professor
- Luís Grilo (born 1946), Portuguese wrestler
- Marco Grilo (born 1993), Portuguese footballer
- Paulo Grilo (born 1991), Portuguese footballer
- Rubén Grilo (born 1981), Spanish artist
- Sarah Grilo (born circa 1919), Argentine painter
- Sérgio Grilo (born 1983), Portuguese football player and coach
