= CSS Working Group =

Working group

- Cascading Style Sheets Working Group
- Abbreviation: CSS WG, CSSWG
- Formation: 1997
- Founder: World Wide Web Consortium
- Type: Nonprofit working group
- Purpose: Developing the CSS language
- Products: CSS
- Members: Adobe Systems, Inc.; Apple; Google, Inc.; HP; Igalia; Microsoft; Mozilla
- Owner: World Wide Web Consortium
- Website: www.w3.org/Style/CSS/

The CSS Working Group (Cascading Style Sheets Working Group) is a working group created by the World Wide Web Consortium (W3C) in 1997, to tackle issues that had not been addressed with CSS level 1. As of July 2025, the CSSWG had 176 members.

The working group is co-chaired by Rossen Atanassov and Alan Stearns.

== History ==
In early 1996 Håkon Wium Lie cooperated with Bert Bos, who was already developing a new browser language called SPP, to produce the first version of the CSS standard (CSS1). They presented their achievements twice, in 1994 and in 1996 at the "Mosaic and the Web" conferences in Chicago. The W3C was being established at that time and Lie's and Bos's work caught their attention.

- CSS level 1 emerged as a W3C Recommendation in December 1996.
- The same group working on CSS was also developing HTML and DOM. This group, the HTML Editorial Review Board, in 1997 was divided according to the three different programs.
- Chris Lilley managed the CSS Working Group, established in the W3C in February 1997, to deal with issues uncovered by the early implementation and adoption of CSS 1.
- The CSS 1 test suite was created by Eric A. Meyer, Håkon Wium Lie and Tim Boland along with other contributors, finishing in 2018.
- In late 1998 the first version of CSS 2 was released. In 1999 a revision (CSS 2.1) was released.
- By 1999 there are 15 members working in "Cascading Style Sheets and Formatting Properties Working Group."
- In 1999 work on CSS 3 started, but until 2006 it faced serious limitations.
- In 2005 the CSS Working Group decided that already published standards (CSS 2.1, CSS3 text etc.) should be re-examined and updated.

== Benefits for members ==
CSS working group members belong to the broader organization W3C. This membership offers to them four important benefits; interaction, strategy, participation and leadership. The first characteristic provided, can be explained more as an opportunity to meet and work with “leading companies, organizations, and individuals” specialized in web technologies. “W3C Activity proposals” are strategically examined and operated by the members, giving them the ability to work methodically. Participating in the CSS working group allows members to change/shape technologies influencing businesses as well as consumers. Finally, CSS members are adopting a significant role into the W3C project of developing the Web standards, which requires leadership skills and dedication.

== Members ==
Members of the CSS Working Group include representatives from the following organizations:

- Adobe Systems Inc.
- Apple
- Google, Inc.
- Igalia
- Microsoft
- Mozilla

W3C has also invited a few experts to collaborate with the working group:

- Brian Birtles
- Amy Carney
- Dael Jackson
- Brad Kemper
- Jirka Kosek
- Vladimir Levantovsky
- Peter Linss
- Jonathan Neal
- François Remy
- Florian Rivoal
- Miriam Suzanne
- Lea Verou
- Sebastian Zartner

There are a few W3C staff members also participating in the group:

- Richard Ishida
- Chris Lilley
- Michael[tm] Smith
- Fuqiao Xue

== Editors ==
Active editors of CSS specifications include the following:

- Jake Archibald
- Rossen Atanassov
- Tab Atkins-Bittner
- David Baron (computer scientist)
- Tantek Çelik
- Keith Cirkel
- Elika Etemad
- Simon Fraser
- Koji Ishii
- Chris Lilley
- Theresa O'Connor
- Florian Rivoal
- Noam Rosenthal
- Khushal Sagar
- Alan Stearns
- Miriam Suzanne
- Lea Verou
- Sebastian Zartner
