= Smashing Magazine =

On-line publication

- Available in: English
- Owner: Smashing Media AG
- Creators: Sven Lennartz and Vitaly Friedman
- Revenue: 2m
- Website: smashingmagazine.com
- Launched: 2006
- Current status: Active

Smashing Magazine is an online publication primarily catering to web developers and web designers worldwide. Launched in 2006 by Sven Lennartz and Vitaly Friedman, both then part of the German-based Smashing Media AG, the magazine focuses on providing resources and insights to the web development community.

In 2012, the magazine expanded its offerings by organizing web design conferences across Europe and North America. These events, known as SmashingConf, were initiated by Vitaly Friedman and Marc Thiele and provide a platform for practitioners to learn, interact, and network.

Several sources have acknowledged Smashing Magazine's influence within the web development world. The Huffington Post ranks it as a leading platform for web developers to find job opportunities.

Conferences

Smashing Magazine hosts four annual conferences that take place in New York City, San Francisco, Barcelona, and Freiburg. Each conference consists of two-day, single-track talks and workshops featuring industry professionals discussing web design trends and insights. Notable speakers include Stefan Sagmeister, Jon Burgerman, Peter Sunde, and Daniel Burka.

Library

On November 27, 2012, Smashing Magazine launched their Smashing Library, containing more than 60 eBooks and videos on web design. The library provides content on design best practices and coding techniques.

Newsletter

A bi-monthly email newsletter highlights the magazine's content. As of August 2022, the newsletter had over 176,000 subscribers.

== Awards and recognition ==
Smashing Magazine received Shorty Award in 2010 and the .net Awards for Best Blog in 2008.
