= Internet in Norway =

The Internet in Norway is available through Fiber or Mobile. The country code top level domain is .no.

== History ==
In June 1973, Norway became the first country after the United States on the ARPANET. NORSAR (Norwegian Seismic Array) at Kjeller just outside Oslo was connected by satellite to the SDAC (Seismic Data Analysis Center) in Virginia, US as part of ARPANET in order to monitor nuclear test-ban treaties with the Soviet Union. A connection from NORSAR to UCL in London was added the following month.

Pål Spilling and Yngvar Lundh at NDRE and Dag Belsnes at the University of Oslo were involved in testing and developing TCP/IP and packet speech over SATNET in the late 1970s. Norway migrated to TCP/IP in March 1982, ahead of the ARPANET.

Uninett was established in 1976 as the national research and education network (NREN). In 1987, Uninett gained responsibility for the .no top-level domain. By 1990, NORDUnet was one of the first networks on the Internet.

== Top-level domain ==
.no is the Internet country code top-level domain (ccTLD) for Norway. Norid, the domain name registry, is based in Trondheim, is owned by the state-owned Uninett and operates under supervision of the Norwegian Post and Telecommunications Authority. As of 9 July 2021 there are 824,489 registered .no-domains. Domain registrations are limited to organizations with a presence in Norway and registration at the Brønnøysund Register Centre; each organization is limited to 100 domains. In addition, individuals residing in Norway may register in the second-level domain priv.no. Other second-level domains exist for organizations of certain types, such as municipalities and schools. The strict regulations have resulted in near-absence of cybersquatting and Norway is the most Northern Scandinavian country warehousing.

== Users ==
In 2013, almost 100% of the Norwegian population had access to the Internet.

== Broadband access ==
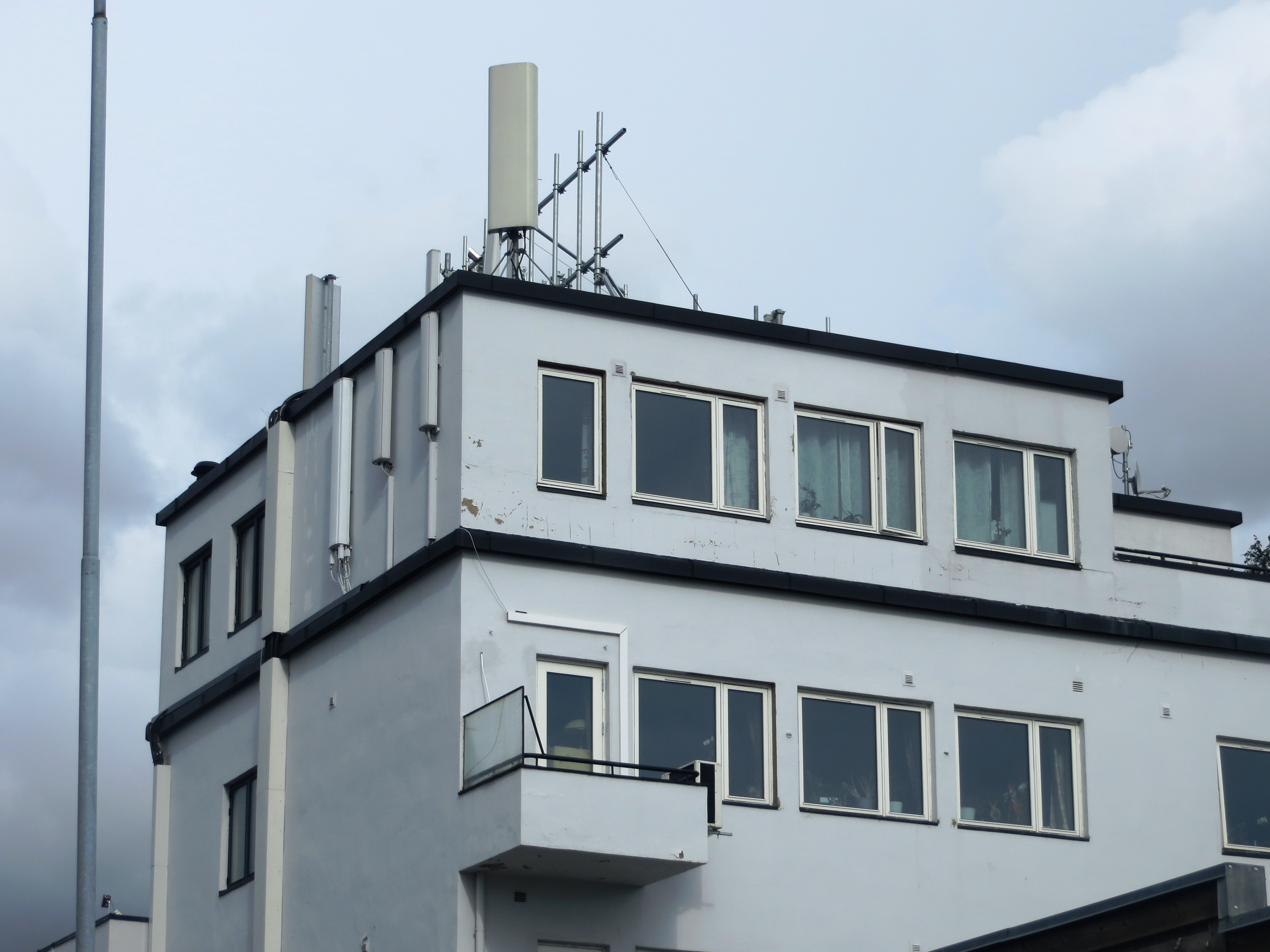
Mobile base station in Smestad, Oslo, with radio panels from multiple operators (2013).

In 2021, Norway ranked 51st out of 193 countries with 2,134,105 fixed broadband Internet subscriptions giving 40.23 subscriptions per 100 population (11th in the world). Also in 2020, Norway ranked 107th out of 193 countries with 5,721,255 mobile broadband Internet subscriptions giving 107.84 subscriptions per 100 population (95th in the world). By the end of 2024, 99.7% of households in Norway had access to basic 5G coverage.

Lyse, Norway, with an average measured connection speed of 8.1 Mbit/s, is the fastest city in Europe according to a 2011 report from Akamai.

=== ADSL ===
ADSL became available to private consumers around late 2000. Depending on the provider, offered speeds range from 512/128 kbit/s to as high as 8/1 Mbit/s for ADSL, while ADSL2+ is slowly becoming available with speeds reaching up to 24/1.5 Mbit/s. Fiber is also almost in every city in Norway now speeds ranging from 2/2 Mbit/s up to 10000/10000 Mbit/s (the fastest available consumer line, only available in place with support for it). Prices vary constantly due to fierce competition between providers, but prices can be found as low as 195 NOK (US$30) per month for the most basic ADSL connections, while ADSL2+ is somewhat higher, starting around 499,-(NextGenTel) NOK (US$82) per month. This is in addition to DSL equipment rental and installation fees.

Some major ISPs that provide DSL services in Norway:

- NextGenTel - http://www.nextgentel.no/
- Tele2 - https://web.archive.org/web/20080916222806/http://www.tele2.no/
- Ventelo - http://www.ventelo.no/
- Altibox - https://www.altibox.no/

There is also a flurry of smaller and local providers all over the country that offer competitive DSL services.

- Nordcall Bredbånd - http://www.nordcall.no
- Mimer Bredbånd - http://www.mimer.no
- Eidsiva Bredbånd - http://www.eidsiva.net
- Enivest AS - http://www.enivest.no/

=== Cable ===
Cable Internet access was available before DSL access, starting around 2000.

Cable ISPs:

- Telia (formerly known as UPC/Chello/Get) – http://www.telia.no/
- Telenor – http://www.telenor.no/fiber
- And many other SMATV networks such as BOF AS – https://web.archive.org/web/20100309101646/http://www.bof-nett.no/

Triple play solutions over optical fiber are increasing in availability and popularity.

As November 2012, all known services include unlimited download with no restrictions.

== Internet censorship ==
The constitution and law provide for freedom of speech and press, and the government generally respects these rights in practice. An independent press, an effective judiciary, and a functioning democratic political system combine to ensure freedom of speech and of the press. The law prohibits “threatening or insulting anyone, or inciting hatred or repression of or contempt for anyone because of his or her: a) skin color or national or ethnic origin, b) religion or life stance, or c) homosexuality, lifestyle, or orientation.” Violators are subject to a fine or imprisonment not to exceed three years. However, the law is little used. There are no government restrictions on access to the Internet or credible reports that the government monitors e-mail or Internet chat rooms without appropriate legal authority.

The OpenNet Initiative (ONI) found no evidence of Internet filtering in Norway in 2009. There is no individual ONI country profile for Norway, but it is included in the regional overview for the Nordic Countries.

Norway's major Internet service providers have a DNS filter which blocks access to sites authorities claim are known to provide child pornography, similar to Denmark's filter. A list claimed to be the Norwegian DNS blacklist was published at WikiLeaks in March 2009. The minister of justice, Knut Storberget, sent a letter dated 29 August 2008 threatening ISPs with a law compelling them to use the filter should they refuse to do so voluntarily.

On 1 September 2015 the Oslo District Court ordered ISPs to block domains belonging to seven major file-sharing websites, The Pirate Bay being among them, as the first court order in Norwegian history to block websites not related to child pornography. A second order was made on 22 June 2016, blocking a further eight file-sharing websites.

== See also ==
- Media in Norway
- Norwegian Internet Exchange
- Norwegian Post and Telecommunications Authority
- Telecommunications in Norway
