= Time in Svalbard =

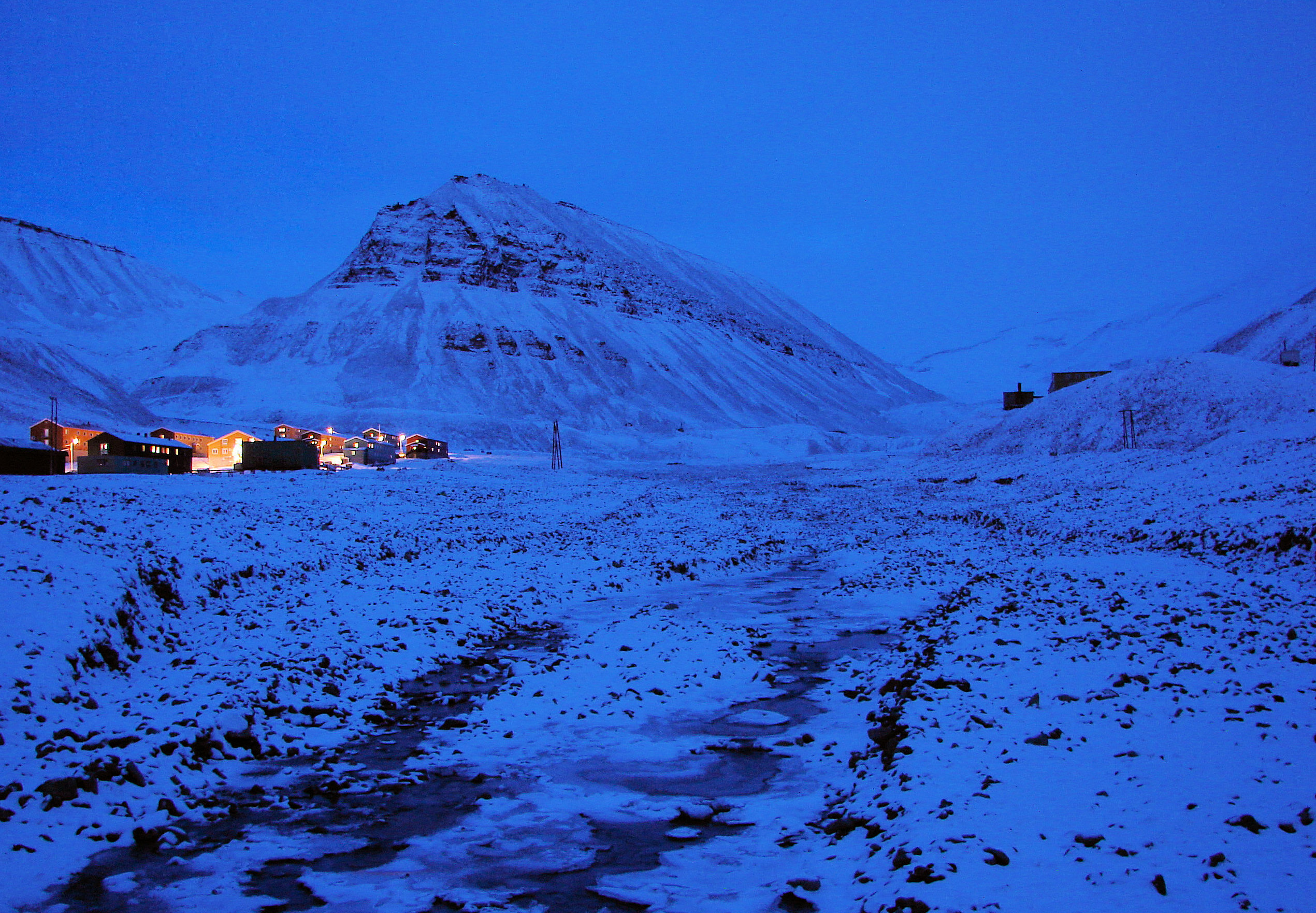
- Characteristic polar night blue twilight, Longyearbyen, located at 78° north.
- Time zone: Central European Time
- Initials: CET
- UTC offset: UTC+01:00
- Time notation: 24-hour time
- Adopted: 1925

Daylight saving time
- Name: Central European Summer Time
- Initials: CEST
- UTC offset: UTC+02:00
- Start: Last Sunday in March
- End: Last Sunday in October
- In use since: 1996 (current alignment)

tz database
- Arctic/Longyearbyen

Time in Europe: Light Blue / Western European Time / Greenwich Mean Time (UTC); Blue / Western European Time / Greenwich Mean Time (UTC); Blue / Western European Summer Time / British Summer Time / Irish Standard Time (UTC+1); Red / Central European Time (UTC+1); Red / Central European Summer Time (UTC+2); Yellow / Eastern European Time / Kaliningrad Time (UTC+2); Ochre / Eastern European Time (UTC+2); Ochre / Eastern European Summer Time (UTC+3); Green / Moscow Time / Türkiye Time (UTC+3); Turquoise / Armenia Time / Azerbaijan Time / Georgia Time / Samara Time (UTC+4); Pink / Kazakhstan Time / Yekaterinburg Time (UTC+5); ▉▉▉▉ Pale hues: Standard time observed all year ▉▉▉ Dark hues: Daylight saving time

Svalbard, an archipelago in the Arctic Ocean belonging to the Kingdom of Norway, uses Central European Time (CET) during the winter as standard time, which is one hour ahead of Coordinated Universal Time (UTC+01:00), and Central European Summer Time (CEST) during the summer as daylight saving time, which is two hours ahead of Coordinated Universal Time (UTC+02:00). This is shared with the rest of Norway, as is Svalbard's use of daylight saving time, which the territory observes annually by advancing the clock forward on the last Sunday in March and back again on the last Sunday in October. However, as Svalbard experiences midnight sun during the summer due to being located north of the Arctic Circle, it gives daylight saving time no utility, and is only observed in order to make communicating with Norway Proper more convenient. At the 74th parallel north, the midnight sun lasts 99 days and polar night 84 days, while the respective figures at the 81st parallel north are 141 and 128 days.

== History ==
The Spitsbergen Treaty of 9 February 1920 recognises Norway's full and absolute sovereignty over the arctic archipelago of Svalbard (formerly Spitsbergen), and has been subject to the laws of Norway since 14 August 1925. Steffen Thorsen of the tz database, which is backed by ICANN, hypotheses that Svalbard has possibly followed Norway's standard time since 1925, and before that had used a local mean time somewhere between 1895 (when Svalbard was first inhabited, same year Norway introduced standard time) and 1925. Accordingly, Svalbard has observed CET since 1925, and has been subject to Norway's laws on daylight saving time.

== Daylight saving time ==
Svalbard observes daylight saving time yearly by advancing the clock forward one hour from Central European Time in UTC+01:00 to Central European Summer Time in UTC+02:00. Daylight saving time begins on the last Sunday in March and ends on the last Sunday in October. This is in-line with the rest of the Kingdom of Norway, and has been observed in this current alignment since 1996. Svalbard first observed daylight saving time by moving the clock forward one hour at inconsistent times between 1943 and 1945, and 1959 and 1965. Daylight saving time was reintroduced for a final time in 1980, and since 1996 Norway has followed the European Union regarding transition dates. As Svalbard experiences midnight sun during summer, it gives daylight saving time no utility, and is only observed in order to make communicating with Norway Proper more convenient.

== Geography and solar time ==
Most of Svalbard lies within the geographical UTC+01:00 offset (also known as zone "Alpha"), including the only permanently-populated island of Spitsbergen. Places located west of 22.5° East, including the western half of Nordaustlandet, are in the geographical UTC+02:00 offset ("Bravo"). As Svalbard is located north of the Arctic Circle, it experiences midnight sun during summer and polar night during winter. At the 74° parallel north, the midnight sun lasts 99 days and polar night 84 days, while the respective figures at the 81° parallel north are 141 and 128 days. In Longyearbyen, midnight sun lasts from 20 April until 23 August, and polar night lasts from 26 October until 15 February. The difference of longitude between the western (10°29'31 E; Forlandet National Park, Prins Karls Forland) and easternmost (33°30'59 E; Kræmerpynten, Kvitøya) points of Svalbard results in a difference of approximately 1 hour 32 minutes of solar time.

== Notation ==
As with the rest of Norway, the 24-hour clock is commonly used, however when speaking informally, the 12-hour clock is often used.

== IANA time zone database ==
In the IANA time zone database, Svalbard is given one zone in the file zone.tab – Arctic/Longyearbyen. "SJ" refer's to the country's ISO 3166-1 alpha-2 country code, which is used for Svalbard and Jan Mayen collectively. The table below displays data taken directly from zone.tab of the IANA time zone database. Columns marked with * are the columns from zone.tab itself:

c.c.*	coordinates*	TZ*	Comments	UTC offset	DST
SJ	+7800+01600	Arctic/Longyearbyen		+01:00	+02:00

Computers which do not support "Arctic/Longyearbyen" may use the older POSIX syntax: TZ="CET-1CEST,M3.5.0,M10.5.0/3".

== See also ==
- Time in Norway
- Time in Europe
- List of time zones by country
