= Entity (disambiguation) =

An entity is something that exists as itself.

Entity may also refer to:

== Arts and entertainment ==
=== Film and television ===
- Entity (2012 film), a British supernatural thriller
- Entity (2014 film), an English-language French sci-fi horror short
- "Entity" (Stargate SG-1), a 2001 American sci-fi television episode

=== Music ===
- Entities (album), a 2007 album by Malefice
- Entity (album), a 2011 album by Origin
- Entity (EP), a 2024 EP by Cha Eun-woo
- Entity (netlabel), a Belgian label specialising in experimental electronic music

=== Other uses in arts and entertainment ===
- "Entity" (short story), a 1949 science fiction story
- Entity FX, a visual effects company
- Life Entity, a fictional creature in DC comics

== Specific uses of entity ==
=== In the humanities ===
- Legal entity, a body holding rights and obligations
- Non-physical entity, in philosophy
  - Spirit (vital essence), in folklore and religion
- Political entity (or polity), in geopolitics and society
- Entities (Bosnia and Herzegovina politics), a form of political division of the country

=== In computing ===
- Entity (computer science), a user-relevant virtual object with an identity independent of change to its attributes
  - Entities (or the entity class) in the entity–relationship model, a conceptual model for data which can be used to design and create relational databases
    - Enhanced entity–relationship model or extended entity–relationship model, a high-level or conceptual data model for design of databases incorporating extensions to the original entity–relationship model
  - Entity–control–boundary, entity–boundary–control or boundary–control–entity, an architectural pattern used in use-case driven object-oriented software design that structures the classes composing a software according to their responsibilities in the use-case realization
- Character entity reference, an XML/HTML escape code for a single typographical character
- SGML entity, a primitive data type in Standard Generalized Markup Language

== See also ==
- The Entity (disambiguation)
- Entitativity, in social sciences
- Entity concept, the accounting principle
- Entity Framework, an open-source, .Net object mapping system
- Entity Registry, a Norwegian database of legal entities
