= ISO 3166-2:SJ =

Entry for Svalbard and Jan Mayen in ISO 3166-2

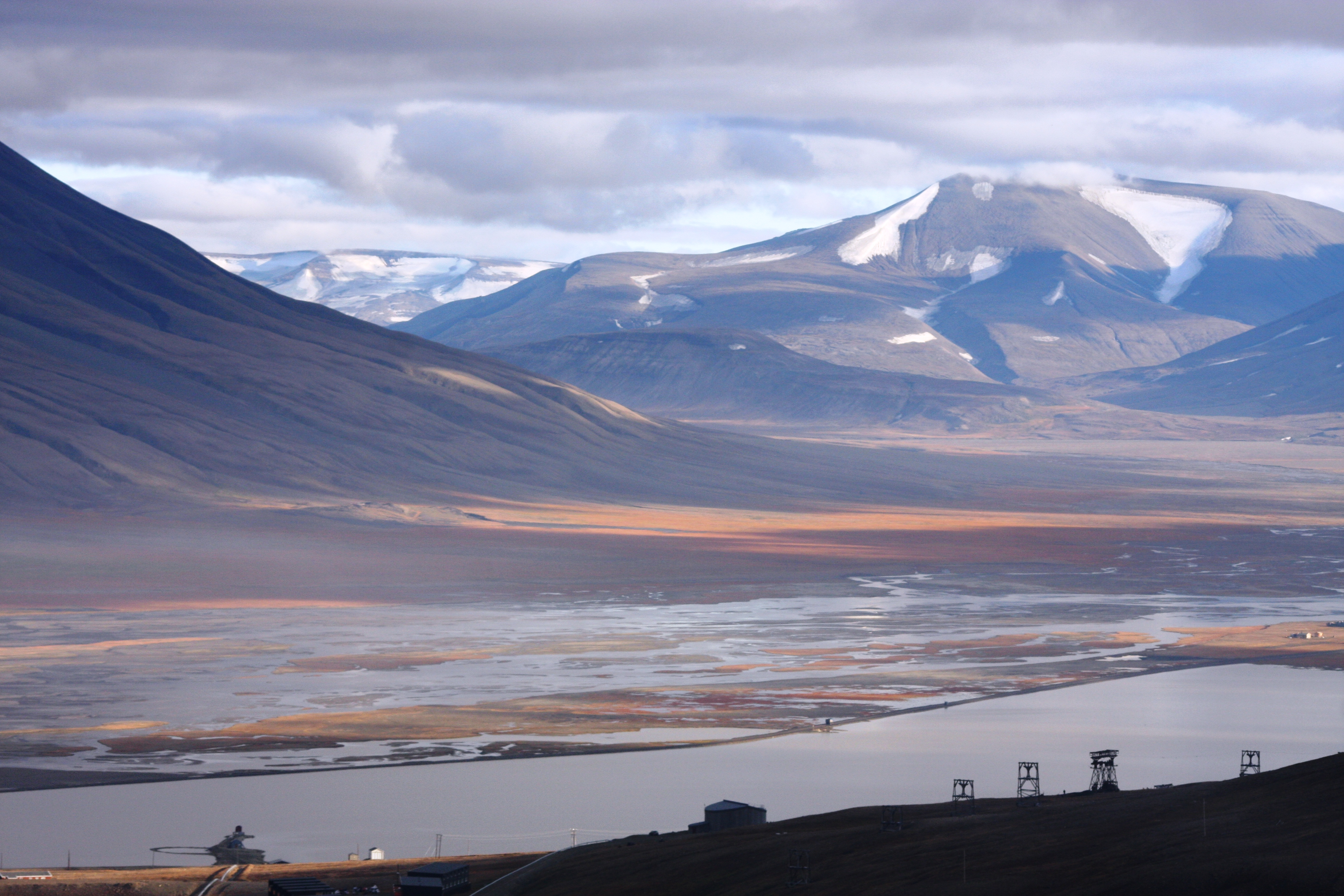
Adventdalen in Svalbard

ISO 3166-2:SJ is the entry for Svalbard and Jan Mayen in ISO 3166-2, part of the ISO 3166 standard published by the International Organization for Standardization (ISO). The standard defines codes for names of principal subdivisions of all countries coded in ISO 3166-1. Svalbard and Jan Mayen does not exist as an administrative region, but rather consists of two separate parts of Norway under separate jurisdictions—Svalbard and Jan Mayen. Further subdivision for Svalbard and Jan Mayen occurs under Norway's entry, ISO 3166-2:NO, namely NO-21 for Svalbard and NO-22 for Jan Mayen. There are currently no ISO 3166-2 codes for Svalbard and Jan Mayen.

== Allocation ==
Svalbard and Jan Mayen constitute two outlying areas of Norway. Svalbard is an archipelago in the Arctic about midway between mainland Norway and the North Pole. The group of islands ranges from 74° to 81° north latitude, and from 10° to 35° east longitude. The Svalbard Treaty of 1920 recognizes Norwegian sovereignty, and the 1925 Svalbard Act established administration by the appointed Governor of Svalbard. Jan Mayen is a volcanic island in the Arctic Ocean located at the border of the Norwegian Sea and the Greenland Sea. Since 1994, the island has been administered by the county governor of Nordland, with some authority delegated to the station commander.

Allocation of codes for Svalbard and Jan Mayen occurs under Norway's entry in ISO 3166-2, ISO 3166-2:NO. By virtue of the collective ISO 3166-1 code SJ, Svalbard and Jan Mayen were grouped together and allocated the Internet country code top-level domain (ccTLD) .sj. As with Bouvet Island's TLD .bv, policy prohibits any registration with the .sj domain, forcing institutions connected to Svalbard to use Norway's domain .no.

== Codes ==
There are currently no subdivisions assigned codes in ISO 3166-2:SJ. Svalbard and Jan Mayen are however given separate codes in Norway's ISO 3166-2 entry, ISO 3166-2:NO.
