= Ihler =

Ihler is a surname. Notable people with the surname include:

- Bjørn Ihler (born 1991), Norwegian peace activist and public speaker
- Frederik Ihler (born 2003), Danish footballer
- George Ihler (born 1943), American football player and coach

== See also ==
- Ihle (surname)
