= Time in Norway =

Time in Europe: Light Blue / Western European Time / Greenwich Mean Time (UTC); Blue / Western European Time / Greenwich Mean Time (UTC); Blue / Western European Summer Time / British Summer Time / Irish Standard Time (UTC+1); Red / Central European Time (UTC+1); Red / Central European Summer Time (UTC+2); Yellow / Eastern European Time / Kaliningrad Time (UTC+2); Ochre / Eastern European Time (UTC+2); Ochre / Eastern European Summer Time (UTC+3); Green / Moscow Time / Türkiye Time (UTC+3); Turquoise / Armenia Time / Azerbaijan Time / Georgia Time / Samara Time (UTC+4); Pink / Kazakhstan Time / Yekaterinburg Time (UTC+5); ▉▉▉▉ Pale hues: Standard time observed all year ▉▉▉ Dark hues: Daylight saving time

In Norway the standard time is the Central European Time (CET). Norway observes Summer Time (sommertid, daylight saving time). The transition dates are the same as for other European countries.

Svalbard and Jan Mayen observe the same time as the mainland.

The westernmost point in Norway proper is on 4°30′E longitude, meaning 42 minutes difference between mean solar time and official time, while the easternmost point in Norway proper is on 31°10′E longitude, meaning 64 minutes difference between mean solar time and official time. The difference between those points is 26°41′ or 1 hour 46 minutes. The 15° E meridian passes Norway in the northern part of the country, from north over Vesterålen and Lofoten islands, then Vestfjorden and finally Salten and Saltfjellet, a total distance of about 320 km. The vast majority of the population in Norway lives to the west of the 15°E longitude.

== IANA time zone database ==
The IANA time zone database contains one zone for the area with ISO 3166-1 alpha-2 code NO (Norway) in the file zone.tab, where it is named "Europe/Oslo". Svalbard is covered by the zone Arctic/Longyearbyen, while Jan Mayen is covered by Atlantic/Jan_Mayen. Both are links to Europe/Oslo.

Data for Norway directly from zone.tab of the IANA time zone database. Columns marked with * are the columns from zone.tab itself.

c.c.*	Coordinates*	TZ*	Comments*	UTC offset	UTC DST offset
NO	+5955+01045	Europe/Oslo		+01:00	+02:00
SJ	+7800+01600	Arctic/Longyearbyen		+01:00	+02:00
SJ		Atlantic/Jan_Mayen		+01:00	+02:00
AQ	−720041+0023206	Antarctica/Troll	Troll	+00:00	+02:00

== Daylight saving time ==
Norway follows the European Union in this matter.

== History ==
Norway was comparably late to introduce an official standard time, mainly due to the lack of a railway network connecting the country in an east–west direction. Throughout Norway, the main means of transport were by cart onshore and ship at sea, both too slow and unpredictable to have an issue with the local time. With the introduction of the electrical telegraph in 1855 between Kristiania (Oslo) and Drammen, the local time of Copenhagen, Denmark was used for this purpose, until 1866 when it was replaced by Oslo local time, which was 7 minutes later. The railways from the Eastern terminus (Østbanen) in Oslo used Oslo local time, while the railways from the Western terminus (Vestbanen) used Drammen local time, a difference of 4 minutes. The unconnected (during 19th century with large gaps to the Oslo network) railways from Bergen and Stavanger used these cities local time, both 22 minutes after Oslo time.

It was not until 1885 the first suggestions came to introduce standard time in Norway, but this met great opposition by influencing groups and locally in the districts of Norway. The most complicated of four propositions was to divide Norway into 5 time zones 15 minutes apart. But none of them was accepted. In 1893 the time issue emerged again, and since the last time, the neighbouring countries Sweden and Denmark had adopted standard time, so also Germany (Central European time). In Norway, the railways in western and eastern Norway were planned to be connected in a few years (happened 1909), and now the proposition to adapt to Central European was widely accepted. Hence, one standard time was introduced on January 1, 1895, and has since then remained Greenwich + 1 (Central European time). On this date church clocks were either moved backward (east of 15°E), or forward (west of 15°E), except for Hadsel and Steigen parishes that continued with their local time as their churches lie almost on the 15°E meridian. The local time continued to live on for quite some time, especially in rural communities, where both the local and standard time were in use (the latter being referred to as railway time).

In Norway, summer time was observed in 1916, 1943–45, and 1959–65. The arrangement 1959-65 was controversial, and was discontinued 1965. Their neighbour, Sweden, did not use it during this period. However, in 1980 summer time was reintroduced (together with Sweden and Denmark), and since 1996 Norway has followed the European Union regarding transition dates.

== See also ==
- Time in Svalbard
