= Norid =

Domain name registry for the three Norwegian country code top-level domains

Norid AS
- Type: Public limited company
- Industry: Domain name registry
- Founded: 1 July 2003
- Headquarters: Trondheim, Norway
- Area served: Norway
- Services: .no; .sj; .bv
- Revenue: 48.8 million kr (2020)
- Owner: Ministry of Local Government and Modernisation
- Number of employees: 21
- Website: www.norid.no

Norid AS is the registry responsible for administering the Norwegian country-code top-level domains (ccTLDs): .no (Norway), .sj (Svalbard and Jan Mayen), and .bv (Bouvet Island). By agreement with the Internet Assigned Numbers Authority, Norid is delegated the exclusive authority to assign, administer and register domain names under these three top-level domains. Of these three top-level domains, second-level domains may only be registered under .no, while use of .sj and .bv is presently reserved.

== Norid ==
Norid is not an administrative body, and domain name assignments are carried out on a private-law basis, without involving the exercise of official authority. Norwegian domains are governed by regulation, and supervised by the Norwegian Communications Authority.

As a registry, Norid administers the name service and the registration service for the top-level domains, and determines assignment rules within the framework of legislation and regulations. The registration service processes applications for domain names under .no in accordance with current assignment rules and maintains a register of rights of use for the various domain names. The name service for the .no domain is required to ensure that the domain names function technically. This service, which is a key element of the basic Internet infrastructure in Norway, sets particularly high requirements for availability and has had no downtime since the top-level domain was first delegated, more than 30 years ago.

== History ==
On 17 March 1987, the .no top-level domain was delegated to Televerket's Research Institute, assisted by the Internet pioneers Pål Spilling and Jens Thommassen. In the same year, the Uninett project was launched, and as a technically competent and neutral party, they took over responsibility for the top-level domain.

In 1993, Uninett was formally constituted as a wholly owned limited company under the Norwegian Ministry of Education, Research and Church Affairs. As the Internet became more popular, more resources were required to operate the .no domain, and in 1996 the domain registry project was made a distinct unit within Uninett. The project was named Norid, an acronym for Norwegian registration service for Internet domain names. In 1997, Norid became the registry for .sj and .bv.

The first domain name policy for .no was published in 1995. The policy was initially quite restrictive. Only organisations (companies and other businesses) could register domain names, and they could only register one domain name, for which they had to have documented rights. In the ensuing years, the domain name policy has been revised a number of times, and many of the restrictions have been removed:

2000:	Permission was given to register general words and expressions.
2001:	The number of domain names allowed per registrant organisation was increased to 15, and the requirement to document rights to names was removed.
2004:	The number of permitted characters was expanded by 23, including æ, ø and å. Following this change, all the official written languages in Norway could be represented in Norwegian domain names.
2007:	Domain names that only consist of numbers permitted, such as 123.no.
2011:	priv.no was originally established as a category domain for private individuals in 1993, and was operated by various commercial players for many years. After taking over responsibility for the operation of the category domain, Norid made it available to everyone again on 6 June 2011. On 30 November 2011, the number of domain names for organisations (companies and other businesses) was expanded to 100 domain names per organisation number.
2014:	Private individuals permitted to register domain names directly under .no.

Following a recommendation from an inter-ministerial working group, the domain area was regulated by a separate regulation of 1 August 2003 (the Norwegian Domain Name Regulations). In February of the same year, Norid was established as a subsidiary of Uninett AS, under the name UNINETT Norid AS. The company changed its name to Norid AS in 2019. Since 1 July 2021, Norid AS has been owned by the Ministry of Local Government and Modernisation.

== Domain name policy ==
Norid establishes all assignment rules for domain names under the .no domain within the frameworks of legislation and regulations, and is responsible for the establishment of an appeal scheme. Prior to making any significant changes to the assignment or appeal rules, Norid obtains advice from the authorities and from users' representatives, and may conduct public hearings. Important stakeholder groups are represented through Norpol, an advisory body that helps develop the rules for the .no domain. Anyone who wishes can also give input to Norid directly.

Assignment rules and appeal rules are designed under a private-law contractual framework. The assignment rules have provisions governing which domain names can be registered and which are reserved for specific purposes, and who can register domain names. Important provisions include:

The subscriber must be an organisation registered in the Central Coordinating Register of Legal Entities or a private individual registered in the Norwegian National Registry and must have a Norwegian postal address.

Limited number of domain names. An organisation (company or other business) may have up to 100 domain names directly under .no and may also register under geographical domains and category domains. Individuals may register up to five domain names.

The domain name. A domain name must have a minimum of 2 and a maximum of 63 characters. Permitted characters: the letters a–z, 23 special characters that cover all the official Norwegian written languages, the digits 0-9 and hyphens.

Protected or reserved names. Some domain names are reserved or protected for various reasons. Examples include ftp.no, www.no etc. This also applies to some geographical names.

A domain name is only created when an organisation or private individual is assigned a subscription for it. The subscription gives the domain subscriber a right to use the domain name, and this right is maintained for as long as the subscription runs. The domain subscriber is responsible for the use of the domain name. Norid has no control over the content of websites and has no mandate to sanction websites that may appear to be breaking the law. This is the responsibility of the Police and the courts. Disputes over domain names are handled by the Alternative Dispute Resolution Committee or the courts.

Norid's website provides more information about things to consider when choosing a domain name, and general issues concerning domain names.
