= .no =

Internet top level domain country code for Norway

- Introduced: 17 March 1987; 39 years ago
- TLD type: Country code top-level domain
- Status: Active
- Registry: Norid
- Sponsor: Norid
- Intended use: Entities connected with Norway
- Actual use: Very popular in Norway; most sites are in second-level names rather than the various third-level registrations available
- Registered domains: 890,567 (29 September 2026)
- Registration restrictions: Open to organisations and individuals in Norway; specific sub-domains have varied requirements; limit of 100 second-level registrations per organization; lower limit for individuals
- Structure: Registrations can be made at the second level, or at third level beneath various geographic and generic second-level names
- Documents: Domain name policy for .no
- Dispute policies: Complaint procedure
- DNSSEC: Yes
- Registry website: Norid

.no is the Internet country code top-level domain (ccTLD) for Norway. Norid, the domain name registry, is based in Trondheim and operates under supervision of the Norwegian Communications Authority. As of 24 December 2022, there were 843,749 registered .no domains. Organizations with a presence in Norway and registration at the Brønnøysund Register Centre are limited to 100 domains each. Individuals residing in Norway may register in the second-level domain priv.no and, as of 17 June 2014, directly under .no. Other second-level domains exist for organizations of certain types, such as municipalities and schools. The strict regulations have resulted in near-absence of cybersquatting and warehousing.

Management of a ccTLD was awarded to Pål Spilling in 1987, but was taken over by Uninett later that year. Norid is the result of several re-organizations within Uninett, in 2003 becoming a separate limited company. Norway has also been allocated two other ccTLDs, .sj for Svalbard and Jan Mayen and .bv for Bouvet Island; neither are open to registration. Originally only a single domain was permitted per organization, and this was manually checked by Norid to ensure compliance with trademark ownership. The regulations were liberalized in 2001, when the process was automated and a retrospective dispute resolution scheme was introduced. This resulted in a boom of registrations, with the accumulated registrations exceeding 100,000 in the course of the year. The 1000th domain was registered in 1995. Domain names may consist of the twenty-six basic Latin letters, digits and the hyphen, and beginning in 2004 three Norwegian language letters and twenty Sami language letters have been permitted. All-numeric domains were introduced in 2007 and priv.no in 2011.

== History ==
Logo of the domain under Verisign

The domain name registry responsibility for .no was in 1987 awarded to Pål Spilling at the Norwegian Telecommunications Administration's Research Institute. The actual registration work was carried out by Jens Thomassen. The first registered domains were tor.nta.no (the Norwegian Telecommunications Administration) and ifi.uio.no (the Department of Informatics at the University of Oslo). Initially the workload of domain registration was light, but after a few years the workload had become unmanageable as a side project for an individual. Policy-makers also indicated a need for the domain registration to be managed by a non-commercial organization. The responsibility was therefore transferred to the publicly owned Uninett, a supplier of information and communications technology to Norwegian public universities, colleges and research institutions on 17 March 1987. The oldest archived zone file dates from 1989 and includes 19 domains. In 1991 and 1992, all state university colleges were connected to the Internet and issued domain names, causing a boom of registrations. The 1000th domain was registered in 1995.

Uninett was at first administrated as a division of SINTEF, but was in 1993 transformed to a limited company owned by the Ministry of Education and Research. Norid was established as a division within Uninett in 1996, and issued the responsibility of managing the .no domain. On 21 August 1997, Norid was given the responsibility for the newly created .sj and .bv domains. Uninett FAS was established the following year as a subsidiary of Uninett to manage the technical network and service infrastructure, including operation of the network systems for the universities and colleges. Thus Norid also became part of the Uninett FAS portfolio. Two organizations were established in 1998: the Domain Resolution Body, to resolve domain disputes, and Norpol, a political advisory board. Domain name registrars were introduced in 1999 to handle aspects that could be provided by a third party. Uninett Norid was in 2003 registered as a limited company owned by Uninett, to secure the management of the domains within an independent organization.

Until 2001, each organization could only register a single domain and had to document its right to the name, either directly connected to the company's name or a trademark; this information was verified by Norid. The rules were liberalized on 19 February 2001. A new cap was set at fifteen domains per organization and Norid no longer made an evaluation of the right to the name; if the domain was not registered it would be awarded. This resulted in a large increase in the number of domains, and the 100,000th domain was registered that same year. Originally only the basic Latin letters were permitted, but from 9 February 2004 an additional twenty-three characters from the Norwegian and Sami languages were permitted, along with the number of permitted domains per organization increasing to twenty. From 13 June 2007, all-numerical domains names were allowed. The 500,000th domain was registered in January 2011. The priv.no second-level domain was permitted from June 2011, which gave individuals the possibility to register. On 30 November 2011, organizations were permitted to register 100 domains.

On 17 June 2014, Norid opened up for private citizen registrations of .no domains. On 9 December 2014, Norid enabled support for DNSSEC.

== Management ==
Management of .no lies with the Trondheim-based Norid SA. Norid is a limited company originally owned by Uninett, which was again owned by the Ministry of Education and Research. Since 1 July 2021, Norid AS has been owned by the Ministry of Local Government and Modernisation.

The legal right to manage the domains is two-fold, based both on an agreement with the Internet Assigned Numbers Authority (IANA) and regulations under the Electronic Communications Act which is supervised by the Norwegian Post and Telecommunications Authority. The policy for use of .no is regulated by the Regulation Concerning Domain Names Under Norwegian Country Code Top-level Domains, also known as the Domain Regulation. This regulation also regulates Norway's other two ccTLDs, .bv and .sj, for Bouvetøya and Svalbard and Jan Mayen, respectively; neither are open to registration.

Registration takes place through a third party, a domain name registrar. The relationship between Norid, the registrar and the holder is regulated through civil legal agreements. The registrar registers the domain on behalf of the holder, and the holder then holds the right to the domain name until it is terminated, unless a dispute resolution dictates otherwise. Norid charges registrars 60 Norwegian krone (NOK) per registration and change of holder, as well as NOK 60 in an annual fee per domain. Registrars must meet criteria regarding technical and administrative resources, must pay an annual fee of NOK 5,000 and a deposit of minimum NOK 10,000, depending on activity level. Registrars must also undertake a minimum activity of either administrating or registering forty domains per year.

Upon registering a domain, the user signs a declaration that they are not infringing on the rights of other parties and that the user will assume full responsibility for any consequences of use of the domain name. The registration process at Norid is fully automated and does not include any steps to ensure that the user has the rights to the name. Disputes regarding the right to a domain name are handled retrospectively, either through the Alternative Dispute Resolution Committee or court proceedings. Issues which could give the right to take over a domain name include infringements of the Trademarks Act and the Marketing Control Act. Trademark holders will also be awarded the domain if the registration was solely made to sell the domain to the trademark owner. The dispute bodies will also consider the risk of confusion, based on the domain name itself rather than the content of the site. For one domain, volvoimport.no, the issue of ownership was subject to a Supreme Court case.

The Supreme Court has ruled that the Norwegian Prosecuting Authority may seize domain registrations under specifications of the General Civil Penal Code, as domains are legally regarded as assets with financial value. As of 27 September 2012 there were 552,255 registered domains. .no-domains had a 90.6-percent renewal rate in 2009, which is significantly higher than more liberal domains, such as 71 percent of .com domains. Cybersquatting and warehousing has not been a problem with .no-domains because of the strict registration requirements. Norpol is an advisory body with thirteen members appointed to discuss and comment on the domain policy. It consists of members from several government authorities, the Internet industry and other stakeholders.

== Policy ==
Only organizations with a local presence in Norway and with registration in the Brønnøysund Register Centre are allowed to register domains under .no. Specifically, they must be registered in the Central Coordinating Register for Legal Entities—and thus have an organization number, have a postal address in Norway and must be able to actually document activity in Norway upon request from Norid. All qualified users may register up to 100 domains directly under .no and five additional domains under each second-level domain.

The priv.no domain is available for registration by individuals. To register, an individual must be registered in the National Registry and have been issued a national identity number, must be resident in Norway and be at least 18 years old. Moving abroad will not result in the domain being deleted, but the person cannot register any more domains while living abroad. There is a limit of five registered domains per person.

Non-residents can utilize 'trustee services' based in Norway for .no domain registration, though these trustees technically become the domain's legal owners.

Since June 2014, individuals are not restricted to the priv.no domain anymore, they can register up to five domains directly under .no, in addition to the five priv.no domains and five geography-oriented domains (e.g. under oslo.no, see below).

Domain names must consist of 2 to 63 characters. Permitted characters are the ISO basic Latin alphabet (a through z), digits (0 through 9), the hyphen (-), the three Norwegian language letters æ, ø and å, and twenty letters in the Sami languages (á·à·ä·č·ç·đ·é·è·ê·ŋ·ń·ñ·ó·ò·ô·ö·š·ŧ·ü·ž). The domain name must start and end in a digit or a letter. A large number of domains cannot be registered, including all that are the basis for second-level domains, and a specified series of geographical names, including names of settlements and islands, which may become second-level domains in the future. Eight specific Internet terms may not be registered (ftp, localhost, whois, www, no, nic, internet and internett). Additional general-category potential future second-level domains have also been blocked, such as com.no and as.no.

== Second-level domains ==
There are three types of second-level domains: geography-oriented, category-oriented and those managed by other agencies than Norid. There are reserved geographic second-level domains for all counties (such as oslo.no for Oslo and nt.no for Nord-Trøndelag), all urban areas with at least 5,000 inhabitants (such as orkanger.no for Orkanger) and all municipalities (such as bergen.no for Bergen Municipality and both inderoy.no and inderøy.no for Inderøy Municipality). In addition, svalbard.no has been reserved for Svalbard and jan-mayen.no for Jan Mayen. Users are asked to not register with a geographic second-level domain unless they have a local presence in the area. The www name under a geographic second-level domain (such as www.lillehammer.no) may only be carried out by the local government of the area, such as the municipality, the county municipality and the Governor of Svalbard.

The category second-level domains require the user to meet specific characteristics; for instance, only upper secondary schools may register under vgs.no. Most of the second-level domains are managed by Norid, although five domains are managed by three other government agencies, the Government Administration Services for central parts of the government, the Norwegian Armed Forces for their own sites and the Norwegian Association of Local and Regional Authorities for municipalities and county municipalities.

List of special second-level domains
Category	Domain	Intended for	Managing organization
School	gs.[county].no	Primary and lower secondary schools	Norid
School	vgs.no	Upper secondary schools	Norid
School	fhs.no	Folk high schools	Norid
Cultural	folkebibl.no	Municipal libraries	Norid
Cultural	fylkesbibl.no	County libraries	Norid
Cultural	museum.no	Museums	Norid
Society	idrett.no	Sports organizations	Norid
Society	uenorge.no	Youth and student companies	Norid
Society	priv.no	Individuals	Norid
Gov't	dep.no	Government of Norway	Government Security and Service Organisation
Gov't	stat.no	Government of Norway	Government Security and Service Organisation
Gov't	herad.no	Municipalities	Association of Local and Regional Authorities
Gov't	kommune.no	Municipalities	Association of Local and Regional Authorities
Gov't	mil.no	Norwegian Armed Forces	Norwegian Armed Forces
