= .bv =

Internet top level domain country code for Bouvet Island

- Introduced: 21 August 1997
- TLD type: Country code top-level domain
- Status: Inactive, but still in root
- Registry: Norid
- Sponsor: Norwegian Communications Authority
- Intended use: Entities connected with Bouvet Island
- Actual use: Not in use; authorities decided that use of the .no domain is sufficient
- Registration restrictions: No registrations are being taken
- Structure: Not in use
- Documents: Policy notice
- Dispute policies: None
- Registry website: www.norid.no

.bv is the Internet country code top-level domain (ccTLD) reserved for the uninhabited Norwegian dependent territory of Bouvet Island. The domain name registry and sponsor is Norid, but .bv is not open for registration. .bv was designated on 21 August 1997 and was placed under the .no registry Norid. Norwegian policy states that .no is sufficient for those institutions connected to Bouvet Island, and therefore the domain is not open to registration. It is Norwegian policy not to commercialize domain resources, so there are no plans to sell .bv. Should the domain later come into use, it will be under the regulation of the Norwegian Communications Authority and follow the same policy as .no.

== History ==
Bouvet Island is an uninhabited volcanic island in the South Atlantic Ocean. It was claimed by Norway in 1927. The domain was allocated on 21 August 1997, at the same time .sj was allocated for Svalbard and Jan Mayen. The allocation occurred because the Internet Assigned Numbers Authority (IANA) assigns ccTLDs to all entities with an ISO 3166 code, for which Bouvet Island is designated BV.

In March 2012, Norid began an initial collaboration with the Dutch domain registry SIDN, with the purpose of examining the possibility of utilizing the .bv domain on the Dutch market. BV is the most common form of limited company in the Netherlands, which could have made .bv a popular domain. The collaboration ended in June 2016, when The Ministry of Transport and Communications advised that dispensation from certain parts of the Norwegian Domain Regulations, which would have opened for the sale of the .bv domain, should not be granted.

In June 2015, Norwegian computer scientist Håkon Wium Lie and the Socialist Left Party proposed using the .bv domain, along with .sj, as online free havens. The proposal aims at protecting both the Norwegian authorities and foreign dissidents from surveillance.

== Policy ==
Management of .bv lies with Trondheim-based Norid, which is also the domain name registry for .no and the unused .sj. Norid is a limited company owned by Uninett, which is owned by the Norwegian Ministry of Education and Research. The legal right to manage the domains is twofold, based both on an agreement with the IANA and regulations via the Telecommunication Act which is supervised by the Lillesand-based Norwegian Post and Telecommunications Authority.

The policy for the use of .bv is regulated by the Regulation Concerning Domain Names Under Norwegian Country Code Top-level Domains, also known as the Domain Regulation. This regulation also regulates Norway's other two ccTLDs, .no and .sj. Should .bv eventually come into use, the same rules and procedures as those currently regarding .no would be used for .bv. The domain remains reserved for potential future use.
