= .sj =

Inactive top level domain country code for Svalbard and Jan Mayen

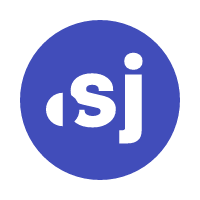
- Introduced: 21 August 1997
- TLD type: Country code top-level domain
- Status: Inactive, but still in root
- Registry: Norid
- Sponsor: Norwegian Communications Authority
- Intended use: Entities connected with Svalbard and Jan Mayen
- Actual use: Not in use; authorities decided that use of the .no domain is sufficient
- Registration restrictions: No registrations are being taken
- Structure: Not in use
- Documents: Policy notice
- Dispute policies: None
- Registry website: www.norid.no

.sj is the Internet country code top-level domain (ccTLD) reserved for the designation Svalbard and Jan Mayen. The domain name registry is Norid, but .sj is not open for registration. The issuing of the domain was based on the ISO 3166 designation of Svalbard and Jan Mayen, which consists of two separately administrated integrated territories of Norway: the Arctic archipelago Svalbard and the nearly uninhabited volcanic island Jan Mayen. .sj was designated on 21 August 1997, at the same time as Bouvet Island was allocated .bv. Both were placed under the .no registry Norid, which is also the sponsor. Norwegian policy states that .no is sufficient for those institutions connected to both Svalbard and Jan Mayen, and therefore the domain is not open to registration. It is Norwegian policy not to commercialize domain resources, so there are no plans to sell .sj. Should the domain later come into use, it will be under regulation of the Norwegian Communications Authority and follow the same policy as .no. There are two second-level domains reserved for the two areas: svalbard.no and jan-mayen.no, but other web addresses are also used.

== History ==
Svalbard and Jan Mayen are two integrated territories of Norway with special status (unincorporated area). The Svalbard Treaty grants Norway full sovereignty of Svalbard, but the archipelago holds special status as among other things a free economic zone and is not part of the European Economic Area and the Schengen Area. Jan Mayen is a nearly unpopulated volcanic island in the Atlantic Ocean and is a fully integrated part of Norway. During the establishment of the ISO 3166 codes, it was proposed that Svalbard have its own code, but the Norwegian authorities chose to also include Jan Mayen in the area, partly because Jan Mayen was administered by the Governor of Svalbard until 1994. Following the ISO codes, .sj was allocated on 21 August 1997, at the same time .bv was allocated.

In June 2015, Norwegian computer scientist Håkon Wium Lie and the Socialist Left Party proposed using the .sj domain, along with .bv, as online free havens. The proposal aims at protecting both the Norwegian authorities and foreign dissidents from surveillance.

== Policy ==
Management of .sj lies with the Trondheim-based Norid, which is also the domain name registry for .no and the unused .bv. Norid is a limited company owned by Uninett, which is again owned by the Norwegian Ministry of Education and Research. The legal right to manage the domains is two-fold, based both on an agreement with the Internet Assigned Numbers Authority (IANA) and regulations under the Telecommunication Act which is supervised by the Lillesand-based Norwegian Post and Telecommunications Authority.

The policy for use of .sj is regulated by the Regulation Concerning Domain Names Under Norwegian Country Code Top-level Domains, also known as the Domain Regulation. This regulation also regulates Norway's other two ccTLDs, .bv and .no. Should .sj later come unto use, the same rules and procedures currently regarding .no would be used for .sj. The domain remains reserved for potential future use. Sale of the two unused ccTLDs has not been an item to consider for policymakers, as commercialization of the domain resources is in direct contradiction to Norwegian policy.
