= Telecommunications in Norway =

Telecommunications in Norway are relatively advanced. There are about as many cellular phone subscription as there are inhabitants in the country (5.3 million), while the number of fixed line telephone subscriptions is declining towards 800,000. As of 2006, 79% of the population had access to internet at home, rising to 95% by 2012.

Norway was the first non-English-speaking country on the net. In June 1973 NORSAR (Norwegian Seismic Array) at Kjeller just outside Oslo was connected by satellite to the SDAC (Seismic Data Analysis Center) in Virginia, US as part of ARPANET in order to monitor nuclear test-ban treaties with the Soviet Union.

== See also ==
- Internet in Norway
- Media in Norway
- Norwegian Internet Exchange
- Norwegian Post and Telecommunications Authority
