= Håkon Wium Lie =

Norwegian software engineer

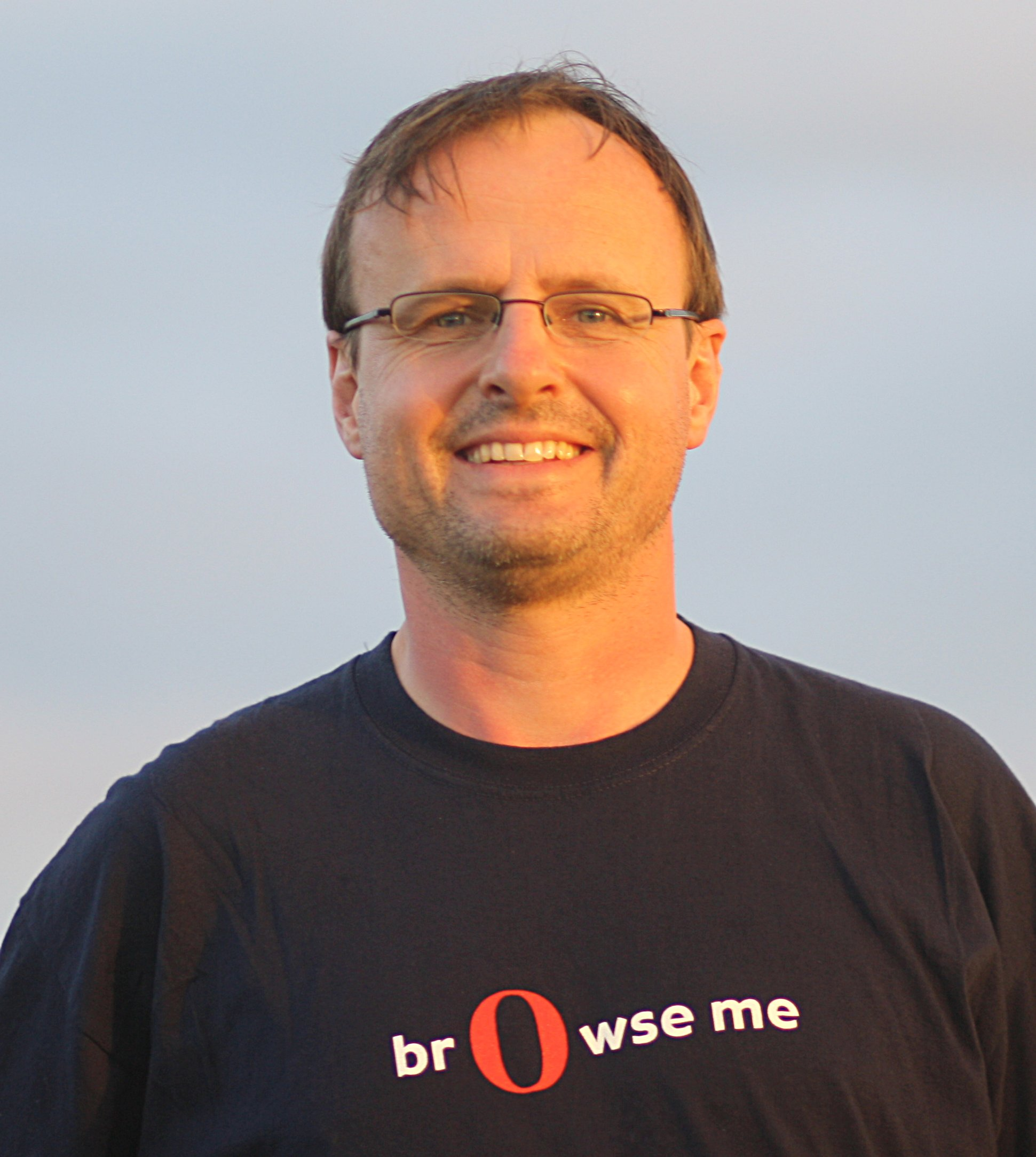
- Håkon Wium Lie, March 2009
- Born: July 26, 1965 (age 61); Halden, Norway
- Employer: YesLogic
- Known for: Cascading Style Sheets
- Website: Personal homepage of Håkon W. Lie

Håkon Wium Lie (born July 26, 1965) is a Norwegian web pioneer, a standards activist, and the chairman of YesLogic, developers of Prince CSS-based PDF rendering software. He is best known for developing Cascading Style Sheets (CSS) while working with Tim Berners-Lee and Robert Cailliau at CERN in 1994. He was the chief technology officer of Opera Software from 1998 until the browser was sold to new owners in 2016.

== Education and career ==
Håkon Wium Lie attended Østfold University College, West Georgia College, and MIT Media Lab, receiving an MS in Visual Studies in 1991.

On February 17, 2006, he successfully defended his PhD thesis at the University of Oslo. His PhD thesis provides a background on the origins of CSS and a rationale to some of the design decisions behind it – particularly as to why some features were not included and why CSS avoids trying to become DSSSL.

He has worked for, among others, the W3C, INRIA, CERN, MIT Media Lab, and Norwegian telecom research in Televerket.

=== Web Standards ===
While working with Tim Berners-Lee and Robert Cailliau at CERN in 1994, he proposed the concept of Cascading Style Sheets (CSS). As a showcase and testbed, he integrated CSS into the Arena web browser, which became the first CSS implementation.

After joining W3C in 1995, he worked on the CSS specifications, including CSS1, CSS2, and RFC 2318 (March 1998). Most of these specifications were developed with Bert Bos, who is considered co-creator of CSS. Over the next decade, CSS established itself as one of the fundamental web standards, with profound impact on typography, aesthetics, and accessibility on the web.

Along with his work on the CSS specifications, Wium Lie has been an activist for standards in general.

In 2005, he wrote an open letter to Bill Gates of Microsoft, asking why Microsoft's Internet Explorer did not support common web standards. A few days later, when Bill Gates announced that Internet Explorer 7 would be launched, Wium Lie responded by launching the Acid2 challenge to Microsoft. Although primarily targeted at Microsoft, the Acid2 test was also difficult for other browsers. Since then, Acid2 and the subsequent Acid3 have established themselves as benchmark tests which all browsers are measured against.

In 2006, Wium Lie started campaigning for browsers to support downloadable web fonts using common font formats. As of 2011, all major browser vendors have implemented web fonts this way.

In 2007, Wium Lie started campaigning for the video element to make it easier to publish video on the web. At Google I/O in 2011, Wium Lie presented the video element in combination with the WebM format which Google had open-sourced.

In 2008, he was spokesperson for a group of technical committee members who resigned over the decision by Standards Norway to vote for the approval of OOXML.

Wium Lie has also promoted the concept of printing from the web. The third edition of his book on CSS, co-authored with Bert Bos, was produced from HTML and CSS files. These files were then converted to PDF by the Prince XML + CSS formatter. In 2005, he joined the board of YesLogic, the company that makes the Prince formatter.

Building on his experience with web printing, in 2011 Wium Lie proposed to extend CSS to support pagination on screens.

He has argued against the use of formatting objects and CSS Regions on the web.

=== CTO of Opera Software ===
In April 1999, Wium Lie joined Opera Software in Oslo, Norway as CTO. His move was motivated by seeing Opera programmers make more progress on implementing CSS in three months than what Netscape and Microsoft had achieved in three years.

At Opera, he spearheaded the development of mobile browsers, in particular small-screen rendering of web pages. Small-screen rendering enabled Opera to show normal web pages on the small screens commonly found on feature phones running the Opera Mini browser.

When Opera Software filed a complaint against Microsoft in the EU over Internet Explorer in 2007, Wium Lie was a spokesperson, stressing the need for Microsoft to fully support web standards in their browser. Opera's complaint led to a settlement where Microsoft started offering rival browsers from a browser choice screen to Windows users in Europe, and Wium Lie declared this a victory for the web.

In 2013, Opera started a gradual transition from its own Presto web engine, to the WebKit engine also used by Safari and Google Chrome. Wium Lie said that it made most sense to work with the open-source communities than to continue developing its own engine.

=== Chairman of YesLogic ===
Wium Lie has been chairman of YesLogic, the developers of Prince, since 2004. Prince uses CSS to render HTML as highly styled PDF with complex layout.

== Political and civic activities ==
In 2005, when politicians declared defeat against advertising towers on public pavements in Oslo, Wium Lie started the Stans.no campaign. In 2009, Stans!no filed a suit against the city for allowing advertising towers to be built in public places, and the city subsequently bought the advertising towers and dismantled them. After the advertising towers were removed, Stans.no has continued working against other types of advertising in the public space.

To encourage sponsors to support the OLPC project, in 2008 Wium Lie ordered 100 laptops and turned his Oslo home into a temporary OLPC village.

In 2012 he co-founded the Pirate Party of Norway, and he ran as their candidate in the 2013 election and the 2019 election.

In 2014, he proposed to use the two unused Norwegian TLDs (.sj and .bv) to create privacy-enhanced zones.

Wium Lie is a self-declared social democrat and he has contributed economically to cultural and political causes. In 2007 he gave a significant contribution to the new Oslo Opera House.

In 2017, he was an initial investor in the Norwegian online alternative newspaper Resett, stating that it was meaningful to help provide a platform for Helge Lurås, a critic of NATO campaigns in Afghanistan and Libya, and Bjørn Ihler, a survivor of the Utøya massacre.

Wium Lie is against Norwegian membership in the EEA and when the party Alliansen was formed as an anti-EEA party in 2017 he was on the election list for parliament for Akershus. However, Wium Lie denounced the party before the election due to its shifting platform.

In 2018, Wium Lie was sued by Lovdata for publishing Norwegian court decisions on rettspraksis.no, a volunteer web site. In less than 24 hours, the web site was closed by the Oslo court, and Wium Lie was sentenced to pay the legal bills of Lovdata. Under Norwegian law, court decisions are exempted from copyright but Wium Lie was not allowed to appear in court. In the wake of this decision, members of the Norwegian Parliament have asked for changes in how Lovdata is organized. The Supreme Court decided the appeal in September 2019, upholding Lovdata's database rights and dismissing Wium Lie and Ljone's appeal. They were ordered to pay NOK 773,200 in legal costs. The Court nevertheless held that material from Lovdata's 2002 CD could be reused because its 15-year database protection had expired.

== Personal life ==
Wium Lie lives in Oslo, Norway. There, he has started web-based campaigns against high-rise buildings and advertising in the public space. Wium Lie also maintains a woodworking studio and runs an organic farm.

== Awards and recognition ==
In 1999, he was named to the MIT Technology Review TR100 as one of the top 100 innovators in the world under the age of 35.

In 2001, he was a Technology Pioneer at the World Economic Forum in Davos.

In 2017, Wium Lie held a keynote at the WeAreDevelopers Conference 2017, talking about his contributions to the web today with the creation of CSS, and how it has evolved together with the web itself up to its current state.

== See also ==
- Arena with the integrated Libwww by Lie.

== Bibliography ==
Lie and Bert Bos wrote a book on CSS, now in its third edition.

- Lie, Håkon Wium; Bos, Bert (1997). Cascading Style Sheets: Designing for the Web (1st ed.). Addison Wesley Longman. ISBN 0-201-41998-X.
- Lie, Håkon Wium; Bos, Bert (1999). Cascading Style Sheets: Designing for the Web (2nd ed.). Addison-Wesley. ISBN 0-201-59625-3.
- Lie, Håkon Wium; Bos, Bert (2005). Cascading Style Sheets: Designing for the Web (3rd ed.). Addison Wesley. ISBN 0-321-19312-1.
- Lie, Håkon Wium (February 17, 2006). "Cascading Style Sheets: PhD thesis". Series of Dissertations Submitted to the Faculty of Mathematics and Natural Sciences, University of Oslo. Oslo, Norway: University of Oslo. ISSN 1501-7710. Archived from the original on October 4, 2014.
