= The Entity (disambiguation) =

The Entity is a 1982 horror film.

The Entity may also refer to:

- The Entity (album), an album by King Gordy
- The Entity (comics), a fictional device from Malibu Comics' Ultraverse
- The Entity (2015 film), a 2015 Peruvian horror film
- "The Entity" (South Park), an episode of the animated television series South Park
- The Entity (intelligence service), an unacknowledged foreign intelligence service of the Vatican City
- Kuwaresma, a 2019 Philippine horror film also known as The Entity
- The Entity, a fiction artificial intelligence from Mission: Impossible – Dead Reckoning Part One and its sequel

== See also ==
- Entity (disambiguation)
