= Pathos (film) =

2009 Italian short film

- Directed by: Dennis Cabella, Marcello Ercole, Fabio Prati
- Written by: Dennis Cabella, Marcello Ercole, Fabio Prati, Giorgio Viaro (co-writer)
- Produced by: Dennis Cabella, Marcello Ercole, Fabio Prati
- Starring: Fabio Prati; Grant Mountjoy; Daniele Gatti; Silvia Quarantini; Giorgio Viaro
- Cinematography: Dennis Cabella, Marcello Ercole, Fabio Prati
- Edited by: Dennis Cabella, Marcello Ercole, Fabio Prati
- Production company: Illusion Video Production
- Distributed by: Distribuzione Indipendente; Unstable Ground, Inc. (North America) (Galaxy of Horrors)
- Release date: 14 February 2009 (ahead of Genova Film Festival)
- Running time: 17 minutes
- Country: Italy
- Language: Italian
- Budget: effectively nil

Pathos i>A<s a 2009 Italian short science-fiction horror film. It was created by the independent Illusion Video Production company. One of the founders of the company, Fabio Prati, also plays the unnamed protagonist in his first screen role. The short was made in the filmmakers' spare time. Set in a dystopian, post-apocalyptic Earth, the film depicts human beings living isolated from one other, slaves of a system of their own invention in control of their senses, thoughts and actions, paying for intense virtual reality "lives" based on a digital copy of human civilisation before its collapse. The short has been compared to the works of Philip K. Dick, and to feature films such as THX-1138, Avalon, Total Recall, and, most frequently, The Matrix.

The short won several awards and honours. Since its original festival run, Pathos has received general theatrical releases through its inclusion in a pair of science-fiction horror anthology films, Corti - Pacchetto Viola (Italy, 2012), and Galaxy of Horrors (Canada, 2017).

== Plot ==
In the near future, huge plains of waste cover every corner of the planet. Global warming makes the surface uninhabitable. Earth is dead. But human beings gave life to an invention, Pathos, a mechanical system that protects them, controls their five senses, and gives them a life for a fee. Free thought is not allowed, and only the pay-dreams provided by the system are permissible. But one day, one man dreams with the help of something different: his own mind.

In a mainly empty room with no windows and faint lighting, the man (referred to by the system with a user numerical designation) is hooked up to a machine via a tube, apparently a set of cables grafted directly on to his head. He imagines a butterfly with wings of four different patterns and colours on its wings. The system interrupts him, telling him independent cognitive activity is not permitted. On a screen there are frequent advertisements for different instant dreams, experiences which are paid for with credit cards. The man sees the advertisements and impulsively, then desperately, types the number from one of his many cards, and then another, and another, but time after time, his cards are rejected as not recognised by the system, which, as a "precaution", blocks his senses, until touch is all he has left, for one last, vain, try. Disconnected from the network, the tube is removed and the man collapses.

== Cast ==
- Fabio Prati
- Grant Mountjoy
- Daniele Gatti
- Silvia Quarantini
- Giorgio Viaro
- Roberto Pedicini (voice)
- Claudia Ferri (voice)
- Edoardo Stoppacciaro (voice)

== Themes, influences, and interpretations ==
The filmmakers have insisted there is no political message in Pathos, emphasising instead themes such as the environment, consumerism, and bureaucracy. Nevertheless, Anthony Marcusa interprets the film in stark political terms: "Those in power are only sucking you dry." Fabio Prati stated that the film is a universal comment on where the human race is going, and that the fictional Pathos system was created out of human arrogance and superficiality, based on a society in which consumerism has gone mad (impazzito). Dennis Cabella and Marcello Ercole elaborate that in the future world they aspired to create, "Pathos" is both the name of the technological system and an effective summary of what this uncaring, bureaucratic system delivers: excess in the form of both "installed" prepackaged experiences or feelings at an unnatural speed, and, since there is no allowance for error, suffering, in a way that recalls a past era now distant and forgotten.

The filmmakers wanted to immerse the protagonist and the audience in a setting at once plausible and impossible, surreal. Setting aside the conventions of architecture, they imagined a space that would deprive a human being of comfort and ease a cubic and cold environment in which the users of the system move, live and work. It is intended to portray the mean simplicity of a decadent future society, and where the complexity of human feelings have been forgotten, and in which humanity has returned to the primordiality of the prehistoric caveman. Aesthetically, the filmmakers were inspired by the science fiction films of the 1980s (Blade Runner, Brazil) and 1990s (Cube, The Matrix), the cyberpunk atmosphere of William Gibson's novels, and the graphics of manga by Masamune Shirow and Katsuhiro Otomo.

Both a scholar and two critics have remarked that what sustains the nameless individual literally locked into a cell is the human imagination, through virtual reality, two of them comparing it to a drug, and one emphasising the consumerist aspect of the situation: "Their brain is attached to a chain that provides them with simulacra of life, like in Philip K. Dick's novels, as long as they pay for it." While the future is certainly bleak, Andrea Facchin alone sees hope for a return to civilisation in the film, since humanity's capacity for imagination endures. By contrast, Hans Howk focuses on the commodified sensory experience for sale, which is "an illusion".

== Production ==
=== Background and development ===
In 2003, Genoa-based Illusion Video Productions was founded by Cabella and Ercole, both of whom had several years' experience in the industry. Fabio Prati joined the company in 2007, an illustrator and decorator with a background working on the historical frescoes of major Genoese buildings, one of the most appreciated artists in his field. Illusion produces commercials, documentaries and animated films, and has quickly become one of the most important production companies in Liguria, the trio's other artistic and creative collaborations earning awards and mentions on several occasions. (Note: Genoa Film Festival: First Prize, Obiettivo Liguria and Public Prize, National Competition; Agorà, First Prize, Best Publicity Spot; Montecelio Prize, Best Advertising Campaign.)

The idea for Pathos emerged during development of the company's previous effort, Strane Coincidenze (2002), a mid-length feature made up of three intertwined stories, one of which was to have told the story of a person in an imagined future, forced to pay taxes even on his five senses, but the subject was deemed unsuitable for the Hitchcockian atmosphere of the project, and so the idea was shelved until Cabella and Ercole, now joined by Prati, decided to make a short science fiction film dedicated to the subject. The self-produced project took three years to accomplish from pre- to post-production, (Note: Other sources state four or five years.) the filmmakers working on it intensively outside of paid working hours (weekends, holidays, evenings), determined to show that, with the right ideas and creativity, they could create a work of excellent quality.

=== Pre-production ===
The screenplay had to be developed in a way that was both feasible and worked with the themes of the film. Preparatory drawings for the sets and costumes came next. The entire film was previsualised and drawn in the form of a storyboard, frame by frame.

If a film of such technical complexity was going to be made on a very limited budget, the filmmakers had to decide how to implement the project and with what equipment. The aim was to visualise, in the smallest details and in the most believable way, the futuristic environment in which the protagonist lives and works. There were two choices: either find the necessary funds through the support of a manufacturer, or make a personal investment and buy the necessary equipment over time, which would surely stretch the production time, but in the end proved more practical, as the arrival of inexpensive high-definition video cameras on the market created new possibilities.

=== Design, filming, and post-production ===
Prati's make-up, which included the design and construction of silicone "implants" over the top of his head and the false brain graft, required a lot of time and attention. Props were made by the Fabrizio Canu Creative Workshop.

Just before principal photography was about to begin, the company purchased a pair of workstations dedicated to 3D graphics and enhanced their Avid mounting system. The film was shot in ten days, with a Sony HVR-Z1. The bluescreen technique, which involves acting against an otherwise blank backdrop with backgrounds filled in later, was used for all the scenes with Prati, done at Illusion's studios. The technique spares the production the cost and time of constructing a physical set, but, as Prati pointed out, it also means the actor has no points of reference.

Due to the importance of digital effects and the number of scenes involved (more than 150), post-production lasted almost three years. For the rendering of scenes in 3D computer graphics, there were only two dedicated workstations, each processing 25,000 frames. All the elements of the computer-generated scenes, from the structure of the room, to the mechanisms, the pipes, with rust and wear on the metal, were intended to suggest abandonment of the structure and social isolation. The faintness of the virtual lighting was inspired by the interiors of Romanesque cathedrals.

The film was dubbed by Suoni, with the participation and supervision of the Italian "star" of voice acting, dubbing director Roberto Pedicini. Music was produced by Universal Music.

== Release ==
Pathos had its premiere on 14 February 2009, at the Cineplex del Porto Antico in Genoa, Italy, under the patronage of, and ahead of its first festival screening at, the Genova Film Festival in July 2009, screening shortly thereafter at the Arcipelago International Festival in Rome on 6 July 2009, where it won the Special Prize of the Jury. The short went on to be screened at twenty or more festivals through 2010, including the Leeds, where it won one of the most prestigious awards for science fiction, the Fanomenon Silver Méliès award.

=== Anthology films ===
Pathos was released in theatres in Italy on 24 February 2012, in the form of the final segment of a feature film with two other Italian shorts under the title Corti - Pacchetto Viola as part of a colour-coded series of short film collections by the production company and distributor in collaboration with video on demand platform Own Air.

Pathos is included (with English subtitles) in the 2017 Canadian science-fiction horror anthology film Galaxy of Horrors, which consists of eight shorts within a larger narrative frame in which a man awakens from a cryogenic sleep pod and is forced to watch the shorts as entertainment while his damaged life-support runs out. The anthology film had its premiere in Toronto at Imagine Cinemas Carlton on 1 March 2017. the feature was conceived by Little Terrors short films festival founder Justin McConnell, who directed the narrative frame, and Indiecan Entertainment's Avi Federgreen. The production is the second collaboration between Rue Morgue Cinema and Little Terrors, following Minutes Past Midnight.

=== Home media and streaming ===
The Corti - Pacchetto Viola anthology is available through video on demand platform Own Air.

The Galaxy of Horrors anthology was released on DVD and special edition Blu-ray in 2017. The anthology was made available through various video on demand options on the IndieCan Entertainment website, on 7 March 2017, and on Amazon Prime.

=== Online platform ===
Pathos is currently available for viewing in its entirety on Vimeo.

== Reception ==
=== Critical response ===
Pathos is called a "must see" by a reviewer at Quiet Earth, noting a perceived "heavy use" of German Expressionism to depict the "bleakness" of the future. Rollo Tomasi adds 12 Monkeys to the usual list of films to which the short is compared, and was impressed by the film's imagery: "This short film certainly has a visual spark. More than a visual spark, a flame. Deep, rich colors here and nightmare imagery."

Anthony Marcusa, Carl Fisher, Karina Adelgaard and Richard Sopko each reviewed the short as part of the Canadian anthology. Marcusa called the film unsettling and disturbing: "It's grotesque and grimy, and stands out the most particularly because it has a simple point brought into stark, powerful relief." Fisher calls the film "interesting" and "extremely watchable" because of the "excellent lead" in the "enclosed space", though "its view on consumerism isn't subtle". Adelgaard was also intrigued, but left somewhat disappointed:

The segment called Pathos was very interesting, but the execution of the storytelling fell short for me. It reminded me of both The Matrix and Cube without really being as clear and direct in its storytelling. (emphasis in original text)

Finally, Sopko calls the film visually interesting "but that's the extent of it".

Pia Ferrara, reviewing the short as part of the Italian anthology, praises Prati's performance, but she is not fully convinced by the post-apocalyptic scenario itself, or, like Fisher, the thinly veiled attack on "money" as the cause of the world's subjugation, which she says has been done before. She gives the film a 2/5. (Note: "Buona l'interpretazione di Prati, non convince fino in fondo lo scenario post apocalittico ricostruito e la neppure troppo velata denuncia all'umanità che insterilito il pianeta in nome del denaro, che sa di già sentito.")

=== Accolades ===
- Méliès d'Argent (Short Film), Fanomenon (EFFFF), 2010 (presented at the Leeds International Film Festival)
- Special Jury Prize, Arcipelago - International Festival of Short Films and New Images, Rome, 2009
- Best Direction, In Genere International Film Festival, 2009
- Best Foreign Short Film, Fancine Málaga - Festival de Cine Fantástico, 2009
- Special Mention, I've Seen Films - International Film Festival, Milan, 2010

== Related works ==
In 2009, the filmmakers were considering turning Pathos into a feature film or a television series.

== See also ==
- Entity (2014 film), another short with striking visuals on a small budget, also anthologised in Galaxy of Horrors
