= Prince (software) =

- Original author: Michael Day
- Developer: YesLogic Pty Ltd
- Release: April 2003
- Stable release: 15.2 / October 2023; 2 years ago
- Preview release: 20191023 / 23 October 2019; 6 years ago
- Written in: Mercury, Rust
- Operating system: Windows, macOS, Linux, Solaris, FreeBSD
- Type: File format converter
- License: Freemium
- Website: www.princexml.com

Prince (formerly Prince XML) is a computer program that converts XML and HTML documents into PDF files by applying Cascading Style Sheets (CSS). Prince is a commercial product, which is free to download and use for non-commercial purposes.

Prince supports all common web standards, including HTML, CSS and JavaScript, through its own code. That is, Prince is not based on a browser engine, but implements its own engine.

Prince can generate accessible PDFs conforming to the PDF/UA profile (ISO 14289, the International Standard for accessible PDF technology) that can be used by people with assistive technologies.

Prince supports many languages, including Thai, Indic scripts (Hindi, Bengali, Tamil, etc.) and right-to-left scripts like Arabic and Hebrew.

Prince is developed by YesLogic, a small company based in Melbourne, Australia. Since 2004, Håkon Wium Lie, the co-creator of CSS, has been chairman of the board.

== History ==
In April 2003, Prince 1.0 was released, with basic support for XHTML, Cascading Style Sheets (CSS), Scalable Vector Graphics (SVG), and arbitrary XML. This first version was a command-line program that supported Microsoft Windows and Linux; there was no graphical user interface for Windows yet.

In December 2005, Prince 5.1 passed the Acid2 test from the Web Standards Project. It was the third user agent to pass the test, after Safari and Konqueror.

In June 2012, Prince 8.1 added support for HTML5.

In subsequent releases, CSS support has steadily been extended, both to have comparable support with web browsers (such as Opera and Firefox), and to add support for print-specific features, like page breaks and footnotes.

Prince is available for several platforms, including Windows, Linux, macOS, FreeBSD, and Solaris. Wrappers are available for Java SE, .NET Framework, ActiveX, PHP, Ruby on Rails and Node.js to help integrate Prince into websites and apps.

== Technical summary ==
Prince was developed primarily using the Mercury functional logic programming language.

The main driving force behind Prince is the standard CSS3-paged that integrates paged media (including PDF) layout specification with any other W3C technologies: HTML4, HTML5, XHTML, and "free XML", working or not with JavaScript.

More experimental facilities for print needs (for example, footnote policies, specifying the size of the bleed area of the page when crop marks are enabled, creating running page headers and footers and similar) are being standardized in the Generated Content for Paged Media (css-gcpm-3) CSS module.

Prince has good support for CSS, with a print focus: better than web browsers for print-specific CSS modules such as the aforementioned css-page-3 and css-gcpm-3; while support other modules is good relative to other user agents not using a web browser engine but not always as well as web browsers: for example, CSS Flexible Box Model was added in Prince 12 (2018), whereas CSS Grid Layout (css-grid-1) is not yet present in Prince 14.

Prince supports most of ECMAScript 5th edition, but not strict mode. Later editions of ECMAScript are largely not supported.
