= South Norway =

Number of regions in Norway

Coordinates: 61°N 8.5°E

South Norway includes sixteen of nineteen counties of Norway.

South Norway (Bokmål: Sør-Norge, Nynorsk: Sør-Noreg, Northern Sami: Lulli-Norga) is the southern and by far most populous half of Norway, consisting of the regions of Western Norway, Eastern Norway, Southern Norway (Agder) and Trøndelag (Central Norway). In English, South Norway was historically also known as Norway Proper, a term that often has a broader meaning in contemporary usage.

South Norway has no administrative functions, and does not constitute a cultural or linguistic region, as opposed to Northern Norway, the northern half of the country. To people from the latter region, citizens hailing from the southern half are known by the exonym søringer ('southerners'). The inhabitants themselves, however, have no common "southern" identity, as they rather identify with the regions they are from and call themselves vestlendinger (from Western Norway), østlendinger (from Eastern Norway), sørlendinger (from Southern Norway) and trøndere (from Trøndelag). Practical use of the region mostly applies to purposes such as weather forecasting.

South Norway (Sør-Norge) must not be confused with Southern Norway (Sørlandet), which is a sub-region with a distinct cultural identity limited to the southernmost county of Agder.
