= Ihle (surname) =

Ihle is a German surname. Notable people with the surname include:

- Andrea Ihle (born 1953), German operatic soprano
- Andreas Ihle (born 1979), German sprint canoer
- Geirmund Ihle (1934–2016), Norwegian politician
- Heini Ihle (born 1941), German ski jumper
- Johann Abraham Ihle (1627–c.1699), German amateur astronomer
- Johann Eberhard Ihle (1727–1814), German painter
- Michael Ihle (born 1986), American politician
- Nico Ihle (born 1985), German speed skater
- Sunniva Flakstad Ihle (born 1983), Norwegian politician
- Yaw Ihle Amankwah (born 1988), Norwegian former professional footballer
