= Entity (2014 film) =

French short science-fiction horror film

- Film poster
- Directed by: Andrew Desmond
- Written by: Andrew Desmond, Jean-Phillipe Ferré
- Produced by: Laurent Fumeron, Frédéric Rossignol
- Starring: Alias Hilsum
- Cinematography: Nicolas Chalons
- Edited by: Jean-Phillipe Ferré
- Music by: Fabrice Smadja
- Production company: RossProd
- Distributed by: Unstable Ground (North America) (Galaxy of Horrors)
- Release date: 1 February 2014 (Festival Gérardmer)
- Running time: 14 minutes
- Country: France
- Language: English

Entity is a 2014 English-language French short science-fiction horror film directed by Andrew Desmond and co-written by Jean-Phillipe Ferré about an astronaut (Alias Hilsum, in a solo performance) who is stranded in deep space and has a close encounter with a sentient entity in the form of a nebula. Entity is Desmond's third film, the previous two also being shorts, Doppelganger and Epilogue. The first French short film to have its sound mixed in Dolby Atmos, Entity has been selected for over eighty film festivals and received, among other honours, a Best Visual Effects Award from both the Hollywood Horror Fest and the FilmQuest Film Festival (in Provo, Utah, near Salt Lake City). Reviews have been favourable, particularly for the short's visual effects.

In 2017, Entity received a general theatrical release through its inclusion in the Canadian science-fiction horror anthology film, Galaxy of Horrors.

== Plot ==
Minutes after the technical failure of her spacecraft, an astronaut finds herself ejected into space. She tries in vain to call for help. She is slowly running out of air. Little by little, fear grabs hold of her, and she faints. After floating adrift for several hours through the immensity of space, she awakens to find herself facing a strange and mysterious and sentient entity in the form of a nebula.

== Cast ==
- Alias Hilsum as the Astronaut

== Production ==
=== Background ===
Producers Laurent Fumeron and Frédéric Rossignol founded the independent video production company RossProd, which specialises in short films and music videos, in 2010. The company's previous short film, Alexandra Torterotot's Once Upon a Bench (2012), was commissioned by the Swiss public television station RTS, and won an award for Best Short at the Warsaw Jewish Film Festival.

=== Development, pre-production, and financing ===
Andrew Desmond and Jean-Philippe Ferré began work on the project in 2012, thinking to make a short science-fiction film set in space that would be five minutes long and which could be done quickly. Instead, the project lasted two years from concept to release. The production team working on Entity was a small one, all unpaid volunteers, with Fumeron also serving as production manager, and J.-P. Ferré as the visual effects supervisor, doing a full previsualisation of the film a year ahead of shooting, working in After-Effects (Ferré also worked on compositing and 3D models and textures).

The film was produced exclusively with French funds, with money invested by RossProd and with donations obtained through crowdfunding website Ulule in 2013, specifically for principal photography, that is, renting the camera, lights, grip, and the studio, as well as expenses such as food, truck rentals, and so on.

=== Filming and post-production ===
Principal photography took place in studio in Paris over two days in February 2013. Only Alias Hilsum's face was filmed; a year followed of editing, visual effects, conforming, colour grading, music and sound effects. In fact, 80% of the film consists of "digital imagery and special effects". Fumeron called it "a very challenging project", with a very complex workflow: the film was shot in 4K resolution using a Sony F65 that had been processed in Linear Aces, but because the team had worked in RGB the year before during preproduction, they had to put everything back in Linear, "which was quite a lot of work to get the result we wanted."

For the 3D film shots, different types of software were used: the spaceship was done in Cinema 4D using VRAY for rendering and the astronaut in her suit was created in 3DSMAX, also using VRAY, then everything was composited back into After-Effects: "I think we pushed AE to the maximum of its capabilities, especially in terms of 2D compositing." When all the CGI was finished, each shot was rendered in several layers, at RebusFarm. Fumeron was "very happy" about this, estimating that what would normally have taken 25 days took about half an hour, especially because they were working in two different locations: "we could launch the render from one place and download it for the other which also saved us some valuable time." The rendered film was then sent to Technicolor Animation Productions for conforming and colour grading. According to Fumeron, the technique allowed them great flexibility, but was very "intense" as there were so many layers to work on. They used Smoke and Lustre for this final stage. Editing was completed in January 2014.

Entity was the first French short film to be mixed with Dolby Atmos, in partnership with Dolby.

== Release ==
Entity had its premiere on 1 February 2014 at the 21st Festival international du film fantastique de Gérardmer, followed not long after by a screening at the 10th Effets Stars, an international special effects festival in Aigues-Mortes. By April 2014, Entity had been selected by six more film festivals, including the Hollywood Horror Fest, where it won the Best Visual Effects award, the Sunscreen Film Festival (Saint Petersburg, Florida), and the Nocturna Madrid International Fantastic Film Festival, followed by the Cannes Short Film Corner in May, the 5th Festival du Film Merveilleux on 28 June, the Loch Ness Film Festival in July, and the 4th Cork UnderGround Short Film Festival in August, where it won the award for Best SciFi/Horror Film. In September, the film was shown over three days at the Festival européen du film fantastique de Strasbourg and at FilmQuest (Provo, Utah), where it again won the award for Best Visual Effects. In October, the short was presented at the 40th Filmets Badalona Film Festival, the Colchester Film Festival, and the Rhode Island International Horror Film Festival. In November, it was screened at the Festival de court métrage de Villeurbanne and at the 9th Nuit du court métrage d'Amiens (an event which takes place in November as part of the Festival international du film d'Amiens, one of France's five largest film festivals).

The short continued its long festival run until December 2015, after an estimated forty festival selections. Entity has continued to be selected for festivals, now totalling at least eighty, with the Caribbean premiere taking place in 2018 at the Trinidad and Tobago Film Festival, and into mid 2019, when it will have its Asian premiere at the Bucheon International Fantastic Film Festival.

=== Broadcasting ===
Ciné+ acquired the broadcasting rights for the film in France, while KQED, Inc., a PBS-member public television station in the San Francisco area, purchased the U.S. local television broadcasting rights. KQED is broadcast in the Bay Area and carried on Comcast cable TV and via satellite by DirecTV and Dish Network.

=== Anthology film ===
Entity is included in the 2017 Canadian science-fiction horror anthology film Galaxy of Horrors, which comprises eight shorts within a larger narrative frame in which a man awakens from a cryogenic sleep pod and is forced to watch the shorts as entertainment while his damaged life-support runs out. The anthology film had its premiere in Toronto at Imagine Cinemas Carlton on 1 March 2017. the feature was conceived by Little Terrors short films festival founder Justin McConnell, who directed the narrative frame, and Indiecan Entertainment's Avi Federgreen. The production is the second collaboration between Rue Morgue Cinema and Little Terrors, following Minutes Past Midnight.

=== Home media and streaming ===
Entity was made available for free online for one week in December 2015. It is currently available on iTunes and Google Play.

The Galaxy of Horrors anthology was released on DVD and special edition Blu-ray in 2017. The anthology was made available through various video on demand options on the IndieCan Entertainment website, on 7 March 2017, and on Amazon Prime. Desmond and Ferré produced an audio commentary for the special edition.

== Reception ==
=== Critical response ===
During its festival run, Entity received "seriously positive reviews" and many "raves wherever it went", as well as "a good fistful of awards in the process". During this phase, reviewers frequently compared Entity to the feature film Gravity directed by Alfonso Cuarón, which had been released in theatres a few months earlier, and to Stanley Kubrick's 2001: A Space Odyssey. Nearly every reviewer was very impressed by the film's visual effects.

Leigh Clark, reviewing the short at the Loch Ness festival, calls it "an ambitious jaw-dropper", clearly influenced by 2001 and "delivered with the conviction of a big-budget blockbuster", saying the film deserves its many awards: "This is Gravity in a nutshell, a claustrophobic nightmare and a delicious visual feast." The short was Tristana Perroncel's favourite film in its programme at the Villeurbanne festival, for its magisterial depiction of, through a peak optical experience, the anguish of absolute solitude before a universal fear of, and helplessness before, the unknown. (Note: "Il s'agit d'une solitude totale où l'expérience optique est à son paroxysme. Crispation et angoisse sont au rendez-vous, réunissant une préoccupation commune à tous, celle de la peur de l'inconnu et l'impuissance face à celui-ci.") Eric Waluski calls the short "ambitious" and speaks of the film's "really impressive visuals."

Richard Sopko, Hans Howk, Carl Fisher, and Karina Adelgaard each reviewed the short as part of the Galaxy of Horrors anthology. Sopko calls the short "psychedelic" and "beautiful", while Howk calls the special effects "gorgeous". Fisher considers Entity one of the films that made the anthology worth watching, though he found the plot wanting, complimenting Hilsum's performance and the short's "marvellous visuals ... mind-blowing imagery that puts many high profile releases to shame." Adelgaard agrees on the latter point: "It's hard to believe you're 'just' watching a short film in a horror anthology when it looks like scenes from a Hollywood million dollar production."

Javier Parra, reviewing the short at the Nocturna Madrid festival, was less impressed, suggesting it was like watching the beginning of Gravity spliced with the ending of 2001.

=== Accolades ===
- Best Visual Effects, Hollywood Horror Fest, 2014
- Best Visual Effects, FilmQuest Film Festival, Provo, Utah, 2014
- Best International Short Film, Galactic Film Festival, Beverly Hills, 2014
- Best SciFi/Horror Film, UnderGround Short Film Festival, Cork, 2014

== See also ==
- Pathos (film), another short with striking visuals on a micro-budget, also anthologised in Galaxy of Horrors
