= Norway Proper =

Parts of the Kingdom of Norway that are located on the Scandinavian Peninsula

Coordinates: 64.9887°N 12.7014°E

Norway Proper as a geographic term in 20th and 21st century usage generally refers to those parts of the Kingdom of Norway that are located on the Scandinavian Peninsula. Before the 20th century the term was often used in English as synonymous with South Norway, the oldest and most densely populated part of the kingdom that historically formed its core territory, and excluded the more recently colonised and sparsely populated Northern Norway. Norway Proper in this original sense included the regions (stiftamt) of Akershus or Christiania, Christianssand, Bergen and Trondheim.

Since the mid 20th century the term has generally referred to both South Norway and Northern Norway, and excluded dependencies and special jurisdictions of the Kingdom of Norway located outside of the Scandinavian Peninsula, such as the unincorporated territories of Svalbard and Jan Mayen, and the dependent territories of Bouvet Island, Peter I Island and Queen Maud Land, all of which became part of the Kingdom of Norway in the 20th century. The term Norway Proper always excluded historical dependencies and territories of Norway outside of Scandinavia, such as Iceland, the Faroe Islands, Greenland and the joint colonies of Denmark-Norway such as the Danish West Indies, the Gold Coast, and the East Indies. The term Norway Proper is attested in English at least since the 18th century.

== See also ==
- Mainland
- Metropolitan France
