= Entity Registry =

The Central Coordinating Register for Legal Entities (Norwegian: Enhetsregisteret) is a Norwegian registry, established in 1995, that stores information about juristic persons (including self-employed people who have chosen to register, and governmental agencies). It is organized under Nærings- og handelsdepartementet.

In 2011, its digital database was made available to participants of the "Open Data Day Hackathon" in Oslo, and Bergen.

== See also ==
- Brønnøysund Register Centre
