= Norwegian Government Security and Service Organisation =

Norwegian Government Security and Service Organisation (G.S.S.O)
- Departementenes servicesenter

Agency overview
- Formed: 1979
- Jurisdiction: Government of Norway
- Headquarters: Oslo
- Employees: 750
- Annual budget: NOK 620 million
- Parent agency: Norwegian Ministry of Government Administration and Reform
- Website: www.dss.dep.no

Norwegian Government Security and Service Organisation (G.S.S.O) (Norwegian: Departementenes servicesenter) is a Government agency responsible for a number of operative administration services for the Ministries of Norway. With about 700 employees, it offers services within archives, wages, accounting, web sites, purchasing, security, the state budget, and technology. It is subordinate to the Norwegian Ministry of Government Administration and Reform and was created as merger of the administrative divisions of each ministry.
