= Bjørn Ihler =

Norwegian peace activist and public speaker

Bjorn Ihler
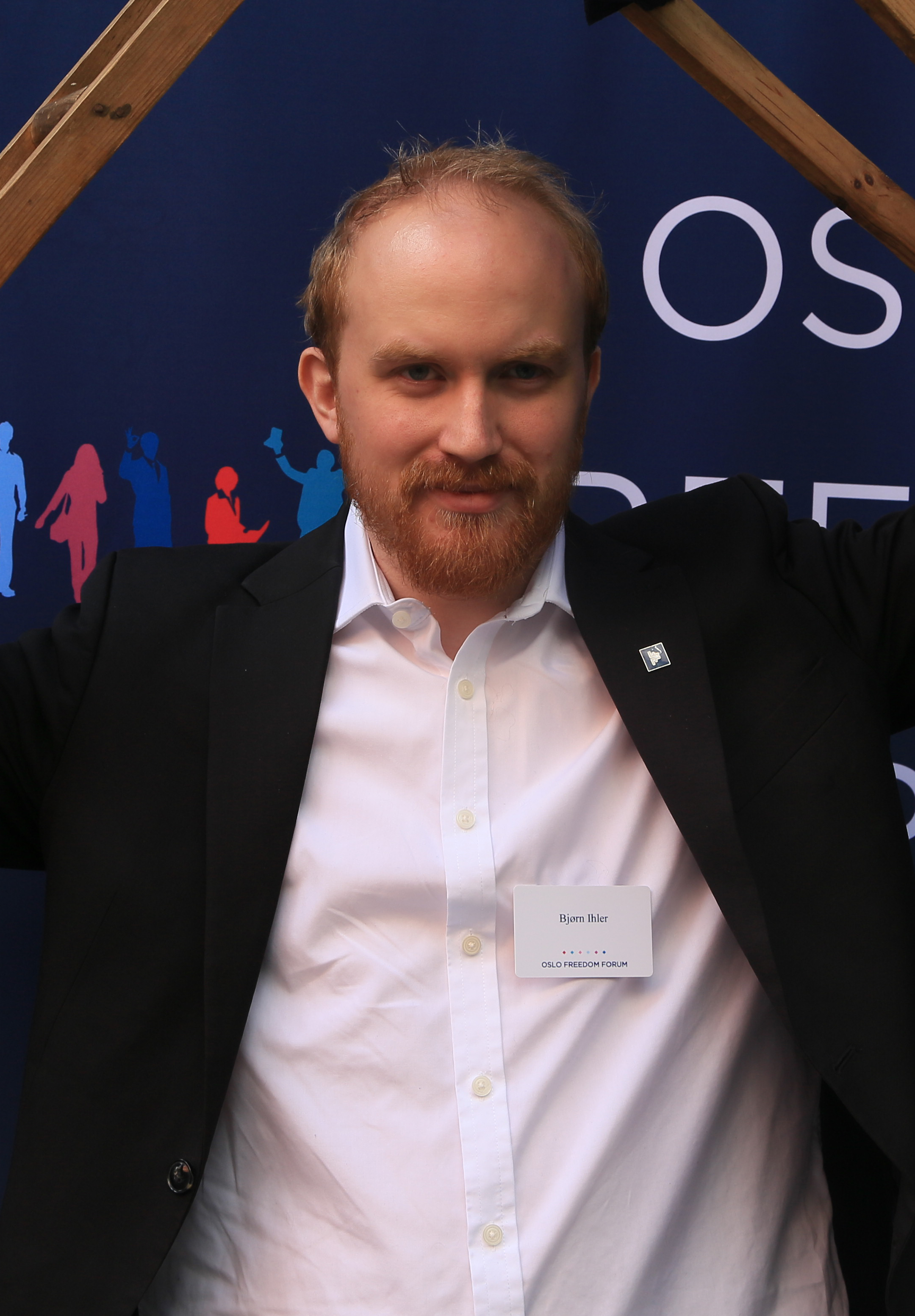
- Bjorn Ihler at the Oslo Freedom Forum 2015
- Born: June 30, 1991 (age 35); Oslo, Norway
- Education: Liverpool Institute for Performing Arts
- Occupation: Activist

Bjørn Magnus Jacobsen Ihler (born June 30, 1991) is a Norwegian peace activist and public speaker who chairs of the Global Internet Forum to Counter Terrorism's Independent Advisory Committee. He is a co-founder of the Khalifa Ihler Institute and was a founding member of the project Extremely together project through the Kofi Annan Foundation.

In July 2011 Ihler survived the Utøya mass shooting.

Ihler has written editorials for The Guardian, Huffington Post, and other publications on the topic of terrorism, and has participated in the Oslo Freedom Forum, where he spoke in 2016 about his experience of terrorism and his work to counter violent extremism.

Ihler is a part of the 2022 Obama Foundation Leaders Europe programme.

His work in countering violent extremism has led him to talk to many former members of extremist and radical groups. A BBC profile of his work has noted that "He claims the unusual and unenviable record of meeting more reformed extremists than anyone else."

Ihler has said that he believes Anders Behring Breivik should be treated humanely by the Norwegian prison system. He told BBC Radio 4 that "Breivik denied us all humanity and all human rights. But that does not ever make it right for us to deny him the same thing. If we do that, we follow the same logic as him I think.”
