= Svalbard and Jan Mayen =

Two parts of Norway under separate jurisdictions

Coordinates: 78.6352°N 21.9939°E

- Flag

- Location of Svalbard and Jan Mayen in the world

Area
  - Total: 61,399 km^{2} (23,706 sq mi)
- GDP (nominal): estimate
  - Total: USD 277,347,541

Svalbard and Jan Mayen (Norwegian: Svalbard og Jan Mayen, ISO 3166-1 alpha-2: SJ, ISO 3166-1 alpha-3: SJM, ISO 3166-1 numeric: 744) is a statistical designation defined by ISO 3166-1 for a collective grouping of two remote jurisdictions of Norway: Svalbard and Jan Mayen. While the two are combined for the purposes of the International Organization for Standardization (ISO) category, they are not administratively related. This has further resulted in the country code top-level domain .sj being issued for Svalbard and Jan Mayen, and ISO 3166-2:SJ. The United Nations Statistics Division also uses this code, but has named it the Svalbard and Jan Mayen Islands.

Svalbard is an archipelago in the Arctic Ocean under the sovereignty of Norway, but is subject to the special status granted by the Svalbard Treaty. Jan Mayen is a remote island in the Arctic Ocean; it has no permanent population and is administered by the County Governor of Nordland. Svalbard and Jan Mayen have in common that they are the only integrated parts of Norway not allocated to counties. Births, and burials (because of permafrost) only take place in mainland Norway.

While a separate ISO code for Svalbard was proposed by the United Nations, it was the Norwegian authorities who took the initiative to include Jan Mayen in the code. Its official language is Norwegian.

== Constituents ==
=== Svalbard ===
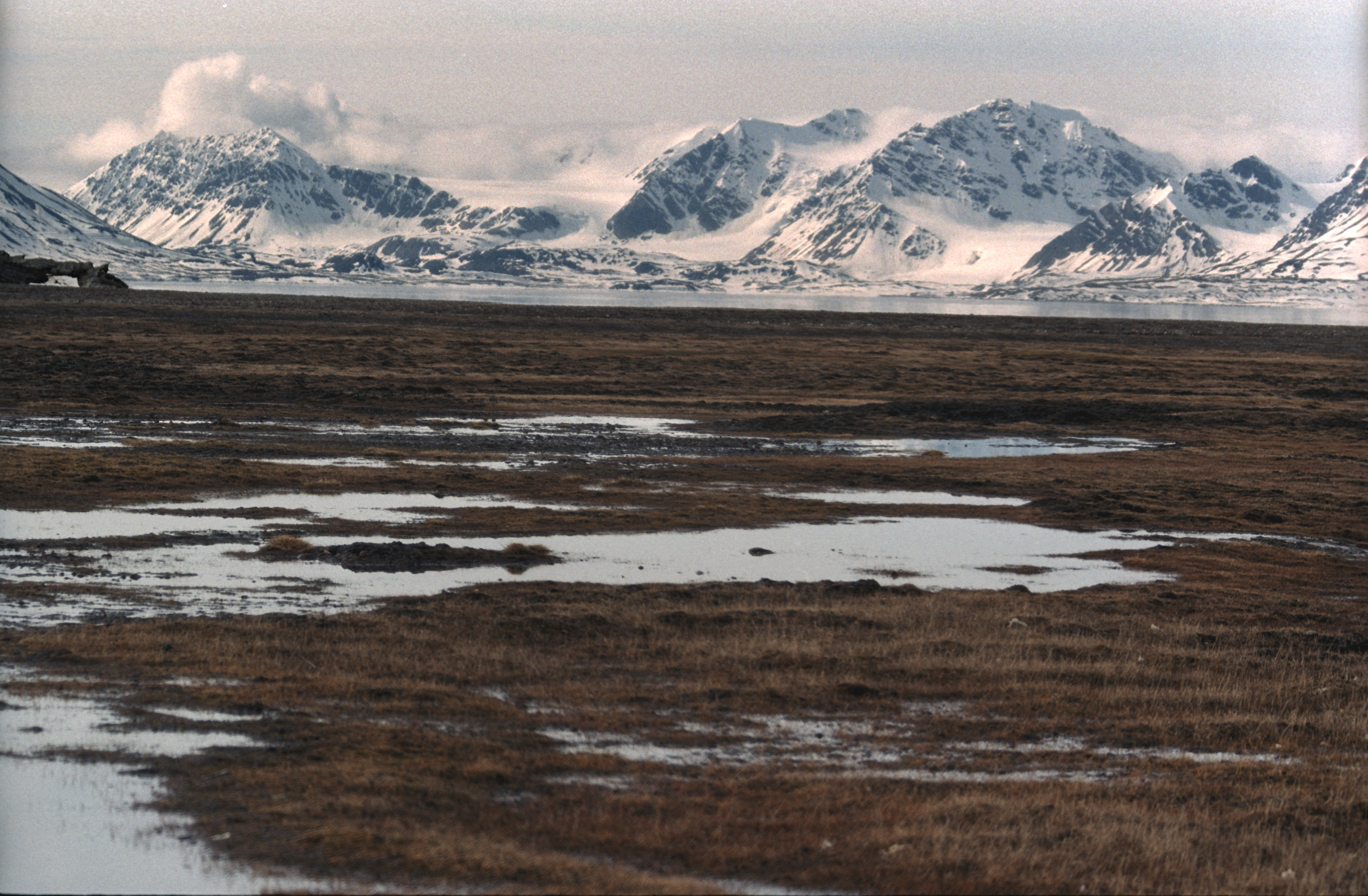
Both Svalbard and Jan Mayen consist almost entirely of Arctic wilderness, such as at Bellsund in Svalbard

Svalbard is an archipelago in the Arctic about midway between mainland Norway and the North Pole. The group of islands range from 74° to 81° north latitude, and from 10° to 35° east longitude. The area is 61,022 square kilometres (23,561 sq mi) and there were 2,595 residents in September 2024. Spitsbergen is the largest island, followed by Nordaustlandet and Edgeøya. The administrative center is Longyearbyen, and other settlements, in addition to research outposts, are the Russian mining community of Barentsburg, the research community of Ny-Ålesund and the mining outpost of Sveagruva.

The Svalbard Treaty of 1920 recognizes Norwegian sovereignty, and the 1925 Svalbard Act made Svalbard a full part of the Kingdom of Norway. The archipelago is administered by the Governor of Svalbard, which is subordinate to the Norwegian Ministry of Justice and Public Security. Unlike the rest of Norway (including Jan Mayen), Svalbard is a free economic zone and a demilitarized zone, and is not part of the Schengen Area nor the European Economic Area.

=== Jan Mayen ===
Jan Mayen is a volcanic island in the Arctic Ocean located at the border of the Norwegian Sea and the Greenland Sea. The single island covers an area of 377 square kilometres (146 sq mi) and is dominated by the 2,277-metre (7,470 ft) tall Beerenberg volcano. The island's only population is a combined military and meteorological outpost that operated a LORAN-C transmitter at Olonkinbyen. The Norwegian Meteorological Institute annexed the island for Norway in 1922. On 27 February 1930, the island was made de jure a part of the Kingdom of Norway. Since 1994, the island has been administered by the County Governor of Nordland, with some authority delegated to the station commander. Before 1994, the Governor of Svalbard administered Jan Mayen.

== In popular culture and commerce ==
Several commercial brands have drawn inspiration from the names of Svalbard and Jan Mayen. The Italian clothing company Jan Mayen, for example, takes its name from the island. Similarly, the Norwegian dietary supplement brand Bard Mayen derives its name from Svalbard and Jan Mayen, which the company states was chosen to reflect associations with Arctic nature and northern Norway. These uses illustrate how the territories’ names are employed in commerce and culture beyond their geographic significance, often symbolizing remoteness and Arctic identity.

== Application ==
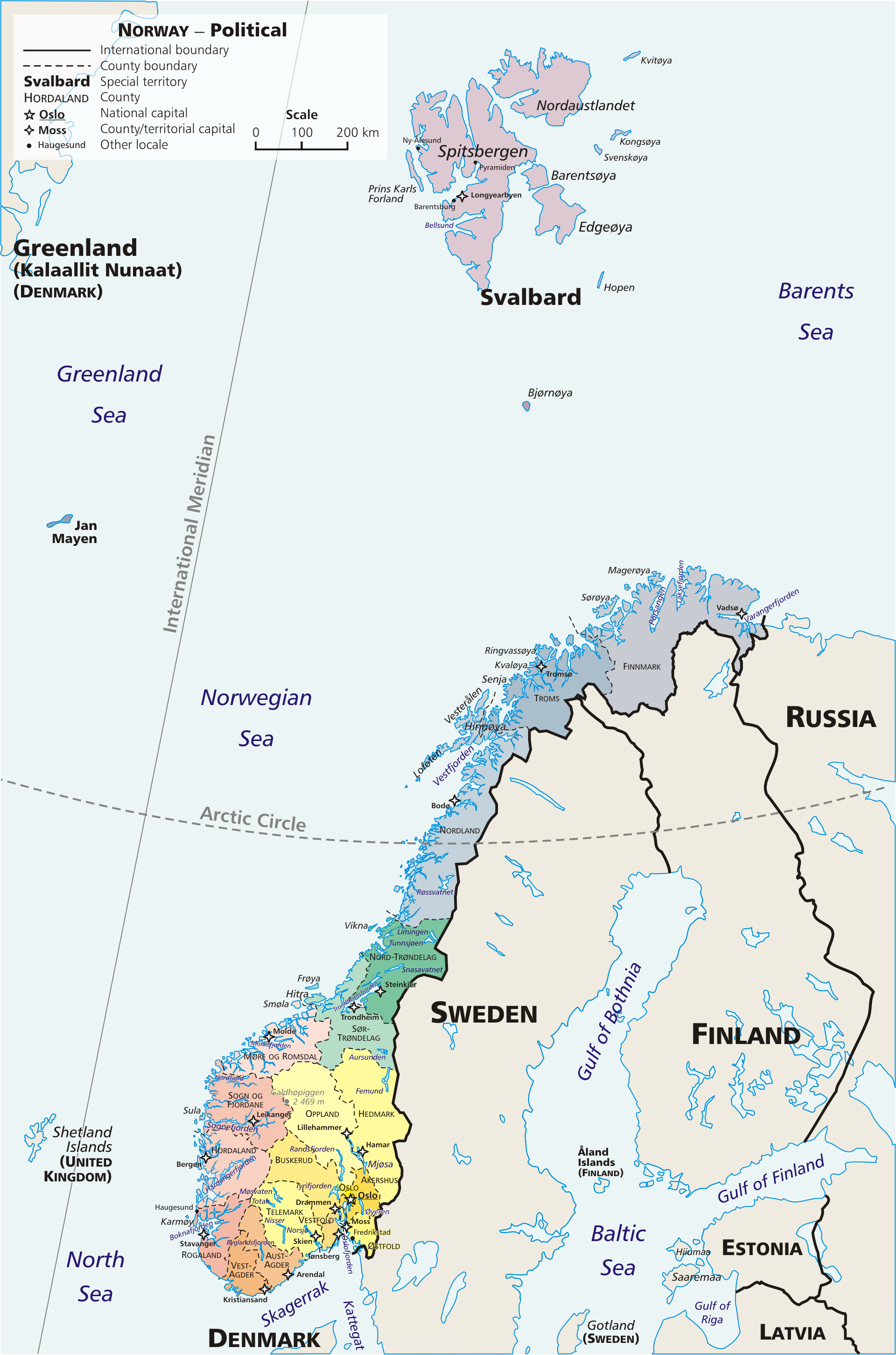
Map of Norway showing the location of Svalbard and Jan Mayen

The ISO designation is congruent with an equivalent United Nations Statistics Division category and users of these classification systems may in some cases report separately for "Svalbard and Jan Mayen Islands" instead of rolling up this information into the "Norway" category. Neither Svalbard nor Jan Mayen have their own flag or coat of arms, and the flag of Norway is used for both of them, both alone and as a group.

An attempt to change the ISO code to just "Svalbard" has previously failed because of opposition from the Norwegian Ministry of Foreign Affairs. However, for statistics use within population and trade, "Svalbard and Jan Mayen" essentially means just "Svalbard".

=== ISO 3166-2 ===
ISO 3166-2:SJ is the entry for Svalbard and Jan Mayen in ISO 3166-2, a system for assigning codes to subnational administrative divisions. However, further subdivision for Svalbard and Jan Mayen occurs under Norway's entry, ISO 3166-2:NO:

- NO-21 Svalbard
- NO-22 Jan Mayen

The hierarchical administrative subdivision codes for Svalbard is SJ.SV and for Jan Mayen is SJ.JM.

=== Top-level domain ===
By virtue of the ISO 3166-1 alpha-2 code SJ, Svalbard and Jan Mayen were grouped together and allocated the Internet country code top-level domain (ccTLD) .sj. Norid, who also administered the Norway's .no ccTLD, was given the responsibility for the .sj and Bouvet Island's .bv domain in 1997. Policy prohibits any registration with either of the domains, as institutions connected to Svalbard can use the .no domain. Norwegian authorities do not want to commercialize the domain resources, and therefore .sj will not be sold to a third party.

== Bibliography ==
- Stange, Rolf (2011). Spitsbergen. Cold Beauty (Photo book) (in English, German, Dutch, and Norwegian). Rolf Stange. ISBN 978-3-937903-10-1.
- Stange, Rolf (2012). Spitsbergen – Svalbard. A complete guide around the arctic archipelago. Rolf Stange. ISBN 978-3-937903-14-9.
