= Uninett =

Former operator of Norway's national research and education network

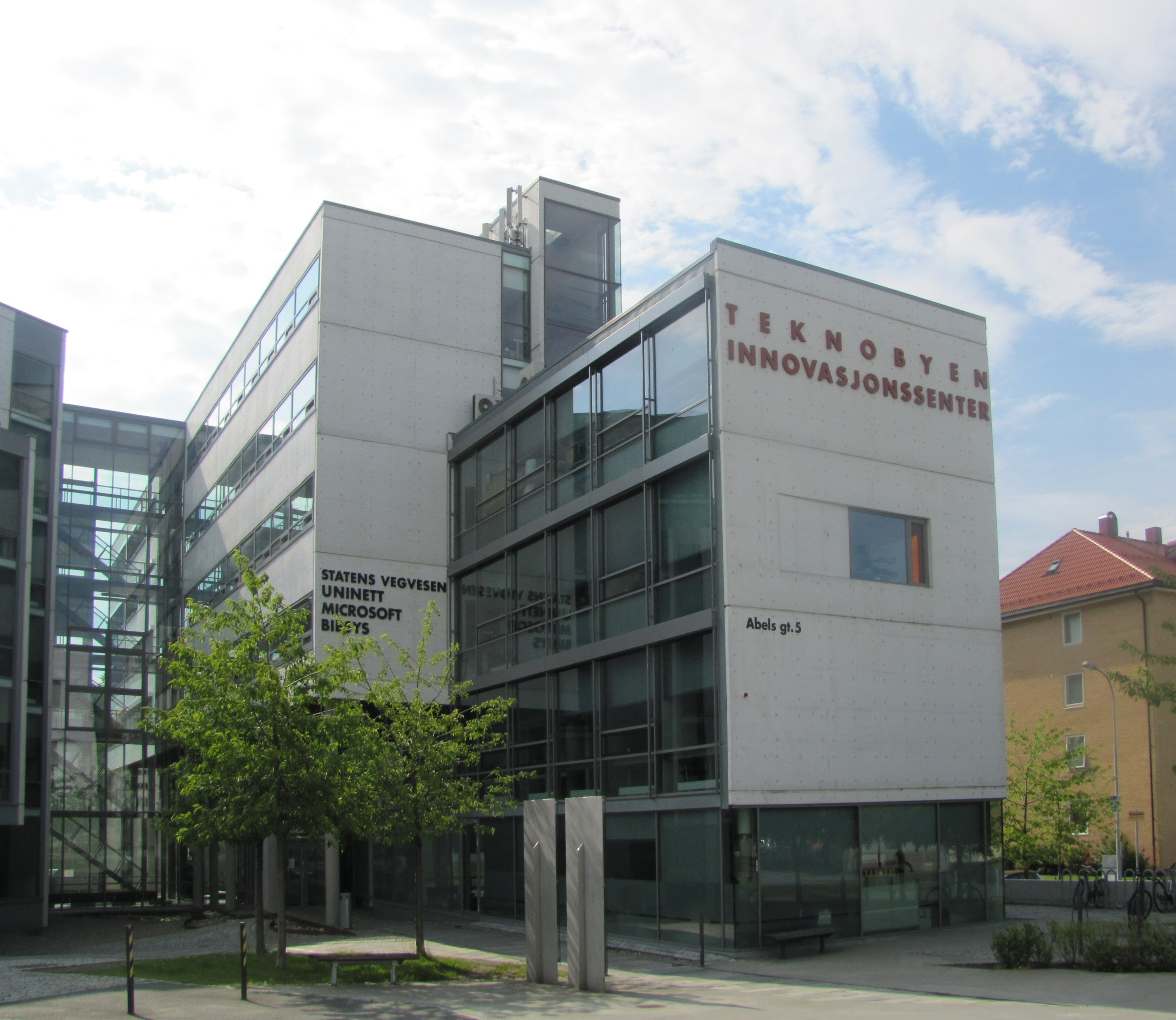
- Teknobyen Innovation Centre in Trondheim
- Type: State owned
- Industry: Telecommunications
- Defunct: January 1, 2022
- Successor: Sikt
- Headquarters: Trondheim, Norway
- Area served: Norway
- Revenue: NOK 287,5 million (2016)
- Number of employees: 110 (2011)
- Parent: Norwegian Ministry of Education and Research

Uninett was a state-owned company responsible for Norway's national research and education network. In 2022, Uninett was merged into Sikt.

The centre of operations was located at Teknobyen Innovation Centre in Trondheim. Uninett had approximately 100 employees. Any non-commercial research or educational institution such as libraries, archives and schools could be connected for a yearly fee.

== History ==
Uninett was established in 1976 as a project based on funding from the Royal Norwegian Council for Scientific and Industrial Research, and was headquartered at SINTEF in Trondheim.

In 1987, responsibility for the .no country-code top-level domain was delegated to Uninett.

The work was continued as a research project in SINTEF, before Uninett was established as an operating organization for the academic data network in Norway. After five years as a project organization, the joint-stock company Uninett AS was founded in 1993.

In 1999, parts of Uninett's operations were separated as a separate company, Uninett FAS (Joint Administrative Systems). FAS was to develop technical solutions for efficient operation of administrative services for the higher education sector.

In 2002 and 2003, two more subsidiaries were established, Uninett ABC and Uninett Norid. ABC was to use Uninett's competence and experience for web development for the other educational institutions in Norway, with emphasis on primary and secondary schools. Norid was to continue the administration of domain names under the .no domain.

The subsidiary Uninett Sigma, was established in 2004. Sigma has later changed its name to Uninett Sigma2, and coordinates heavy computing and storage in the higher education sector.

Following a request from the Ministry of Education and Research to pool the state resources within ICT in basic education, Uninett ABC was separated from the group at the turn of the year 2009/2010.

Uninett FAS was wound up as a separate company on 31 December 2011.

On February 4, 2021, the Solberg government announced a reorganization of knowledge management under the Ministry of Education and Research. This included merging Uninett into the new agency Sikt, which began operations on January 1, 2022, led by Roar Olsen, former director of Uninett and Unit.
