= Brønnøysund Register Centre =

Norwegian government agency and registration authority

- Company type: Government agency
- Industry: Registry
- Founded: 1 January 1988
- Headquarters: Brønnøysund, Norway
- Area served: Norway
- Key people: Inger-Lise Strøm (Director)
- Number of employees: 480
- Parent: Norwegian Ministry of Trade and Industry
- Website: www.brreg.no

Brønnøysund Register Centre (Norwegian Bokmål: Brønnøysundregistrene; formal name Registerenheten i Brønnøysund, Norwegian Nynorsk: Brønnøysundregistra) is a Norwegian government agency that is responsible for the management of numerous public registers for Norway, and governmental systems for digital exchange of information. The agency maintains the Norwegian metadata repository SERES and ELMER, a standard for the design of web forms. The register gets its name from the town Brønnøysund in Nordland where it is located.

Most of the registers are related to commerce, but also personal registers are conducted by Brønnøysund. The register is part of the European Business Register and is led by Lars Peder Brekk. The registry is a subsidiary of the Norwegian Ministry of Trade and Industry.

== Registers ==
- The Aquaculture Register
- Central Coordinating Register for Legal Entities
- Register of Business Enterprises
- Eco-Management and Audit Scheme Register
- Register of Company Accounts
- Register of the Reporting Obligations of Enterprises
- Register of Mortgaged Moveable Property
- Register of Bankruptcies

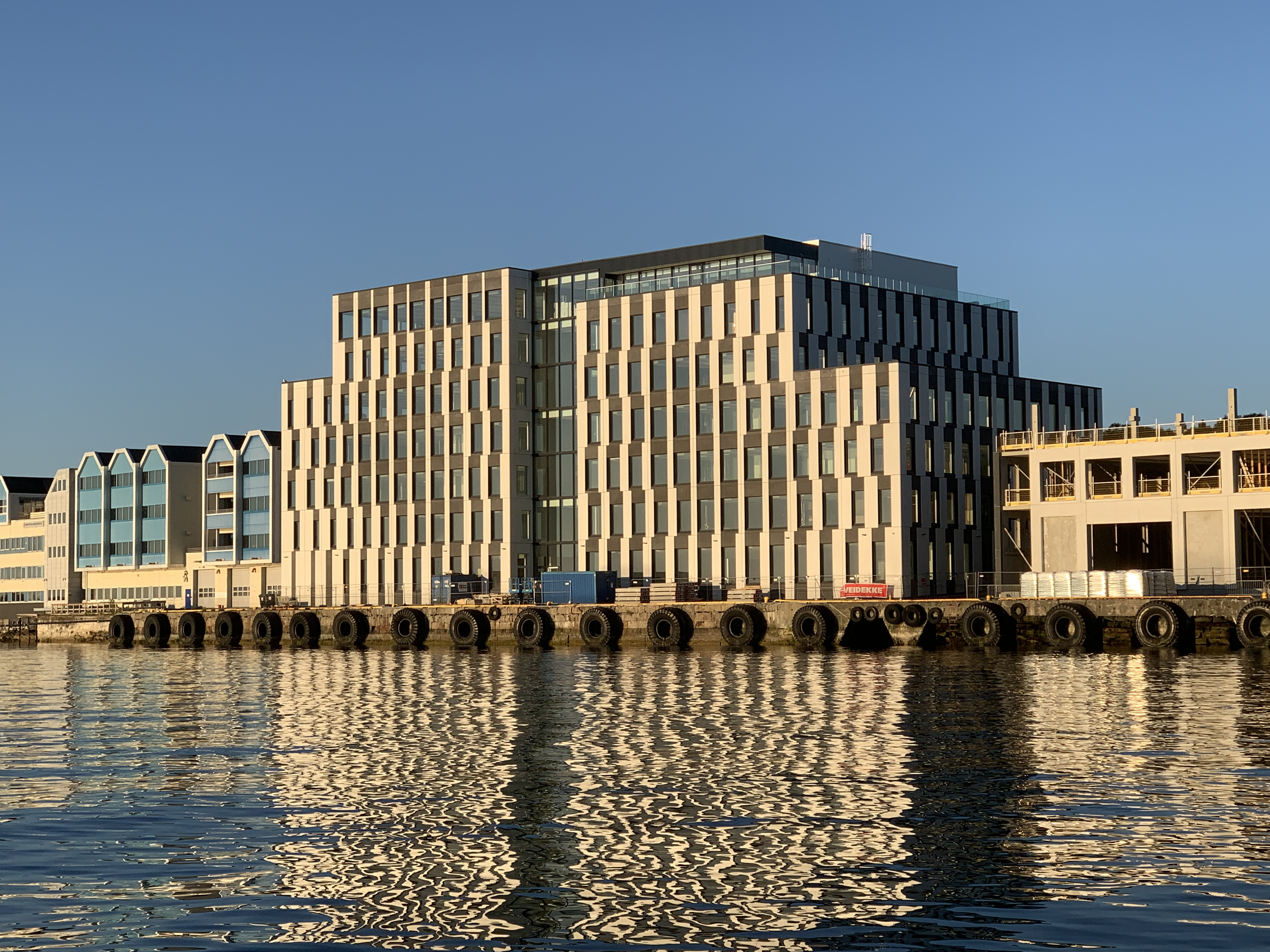
Brønnøysund Register Centre Headquarter in Brønnøysund

- Register of Marriage Settlements
- Register of Private Debt Amnesty
- Register of Political Parties
- Register of Non-profit Organizations
- The Register of Hunters
- Central Marketing Exclusion Register
- Voluntary Register of Complementary Practitioners
- Municipal Reporting Register
- The State Aid Register

== See also ==
- List of company registers
