= Norwegian Communications Authority =

- Nasjonal kommunikasjonsmyndighet

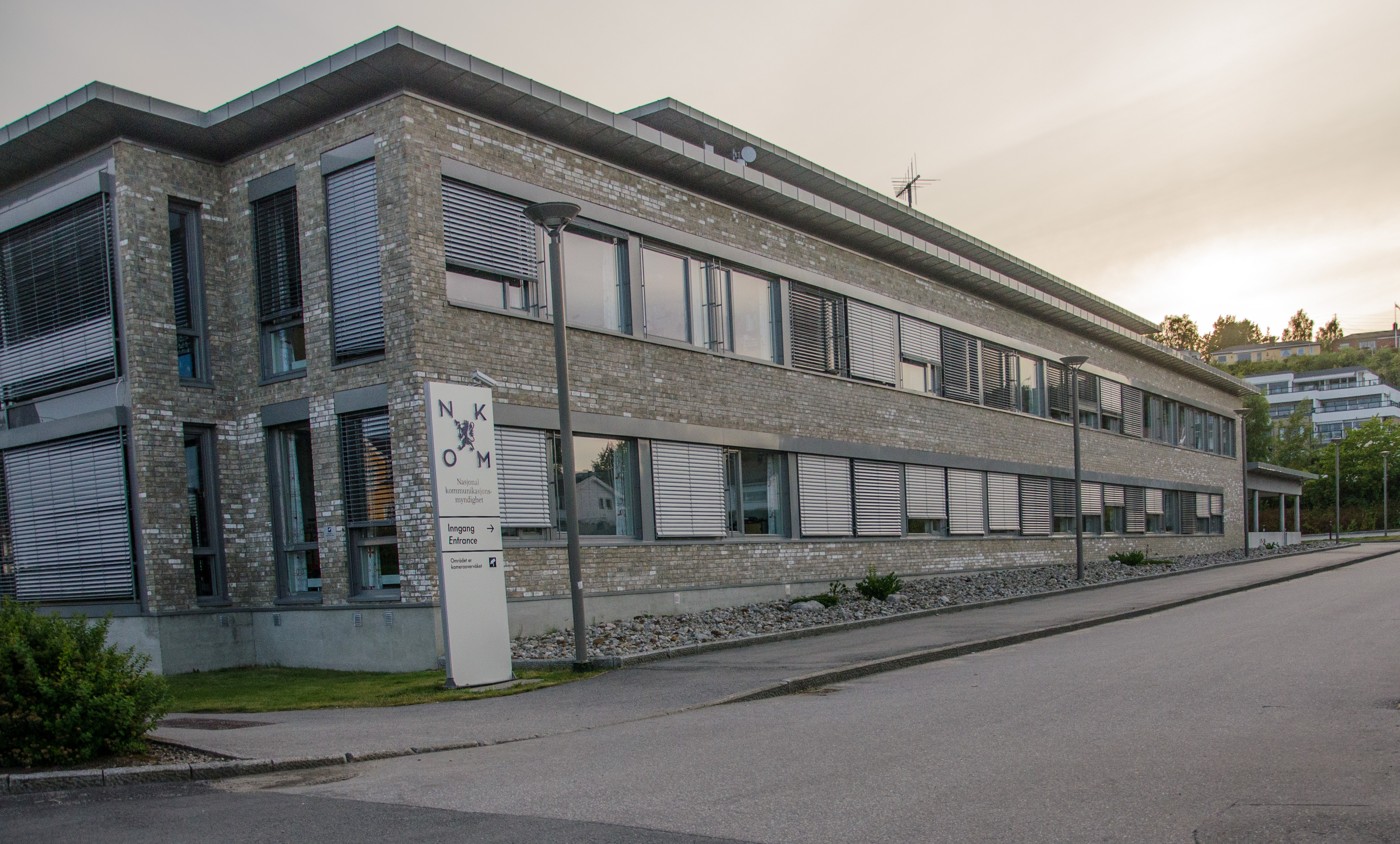

Agency overview
- Formed: 1987
- Jurisdiction: Government of Norway
- Headquarters: Lillesand
- Parent agency: Norwegian Ministry of Local Government and Regional Development
- Website: nkom.no

The Norwegian Communications Authority (Norwegian: Nasjonal kommnikasjonsmyndighet, often shortened to Nkom), prior to 2015 the Norwegian Post and Telecommunications Authority (Post- og teletilsynet) is a Norwegian government agency responsible for controlling and regulating the telecommunication and postal sector of Norway. The agencies main responsibilities are controlling the telecom market, issuing frequency concessions and telephone numbers. It is located in Lillesand and is financed though fees charged to the telecom companies. The authority dates back to 1987 when it was created as the Norwegian Telecommunications Authority (Teletilsynet). In 1997, it also received responsibility for the postal sector.
